The Tata Steel Chess Tournament is an annual chess tournament held in January in Wijk aan Zee, the Netherlands. It was called the Hoogovens Tournament  from its creation in 1938 until the sponsor Koninklijke Hoogovens merged with British Steel to form the Corus Group in 1999, after which the tournament was called the Corus Chess Tournament. Corus Group became Tata Steel Europe in 2007. Despite the name changes, the series is numbered sequentially from its Hoogovens beginnings; for example, the 2011 event was referred to as the 73rd Tata Steel Chess Tournament.

Top grandmasters compete in the tournament, but regular club players are welcome to play as well. The Masters group pits fourteen of the world's best against each other in a round-robin tournament, and has sometimes been described as the "Wimbledon of Chess". Since 1938, there has been a long list of famous winners, including Max Euwe, Bent Larsen, Tigran Petrosian, Paul Keres, Lajos Portisch, Boris Spassky, Mikhail Botvinnik, Mikhail Tal, Viktor Korchnoi, Jan Timman, Anatoly Karpov, Vasyl Ivanchuk, Vladimir Kramnik, Garry Kasparov, Viswanathan Anand, Veselin Topalov, Levon Aronian, Sergey Karjakin, and Magnus Carlsen. Of the nine World Chess Champions since the first tournament in 1938, only three --Alexander Alekhine, Vasily Smyslov and Bobby Fischer —have not won it. In 2001, nine of the top ten players in the world participated.

Magnus Carlsen holds the record for most wins at the tournament, with eight titles to his name. Anand is the only other player to have won the event five or more times. Anand also holds the record of most consecutive games played at the tournament without a loss (70 – from 1998 to 2004).

Tournament history

Hoogovens Beverwijk
The early tournaments were very small, starting with groups of four in 1938, and entry restricted to Dutch players. The first five tournaments continued this way, with the contest held annually early in January. In 1943 and 1944 the tournament field was doubled in size to eight players. No tournament was held in 1945 due to World War II. The first international tournament was held in 1946. The main tournament field was expanded to ten, with invitations to Alberic O'Kelly de Galway (Belgium) and Gösta Stoltz (Sweden) along with a Dutch contingent of eight.

The tournament field remained at ten until 1953 when it was increased to twelve, and an international women's tournament was also held. In 1954 the tournament field was returned to ten players, but the strength of the competitions increased. The field was greatly enlarged to 18 in 1963, and although it reduced to 16 in 1964, the event had become the strongest international chess tournament in the world .

As the tournament grew in stature, the ancillary women's tournament became a regular feature, as did a 'Masters' event and 'Masters Reserves' events. There also began a tradition to operate a year on year invitation policy that resembled the system used in football 'league tables'; the winner of a lesser category event would receive an invitation to the next higher event the following year.

The 1946 tournament was one of the first European international chess tournaments after World War II. Food shortages were still a problem in Europe, so the post-tournament banquet featured pea soup, inexpensive fare of the common people. In subsequent years pea soup has been served as the first course of the concluding banquet, a tradition continued when the tournament was moved from Beverwijk to Wijk aan Zee .

Winners of the top group:
1938 –  Jilling Van Dijk and  Philip Bakker
1939 –  Nicolaas Cortlever
1940 –  Max Euwe
1941 –  Arthur Wijnans
1942 –  Max Euwe (2)
1943 –  Arnold van den Hoek
1944 –  Theo van Scheltinga
1945 – no tournament
1946 –  Alberic O'Kelly de Galway
1947 –  Theo van Scheltinga (2)
1948 –  Lodewijk Prins
1949 –  Savielly Tartakower
1950 –  Jan Hein Donner
1951 –  Hermann Pilnik
1952 –  Max Euwe (3)
1953 –  Nicolas Rossolimo
1954 –  Hans Bouwmeester and  Vasja Pirc
1955 –  Borislav Milić
1956 –  Gideon Ståhlberg
1957 –  Aleksandar Matanović
1958 –  Max Euwe (4) and  Jan Hein Donner (2)
1959 –  Friðrik Ólafsson
1960 –  Bent Larsen and  Tigran Petrosian
1961 –  Bent Larsen (2) and  Borislav Ivkov
1962 –  Petar Trifunović
1963 –  Jan Hein Donner (3)
1964 –  Paul Keres and  Iivo Nei
1965 –  Lajos Portisch and  Efim Geller
1966 –  Lev Polugaevsky
1967 –  Boris Spassky

Hoogovens Wijk aan Zee

The tournament was moved to the Dutch seaside town Wijk aan Zee in 1968.
In this period, the tournament was popularly called both "Hoogovens" and "Wijk aan Zee".
Winners of the Grandmaster A group since 1968 have been:
1968 –  Viktor Korchnoi
1969 –  Mikhail Botvinnik and  Efim Geller (2)
1970 –  Mark Taimanov
1971 –  Viktor Korchnoi (2)
1972 –  Lajos Portisch (2)
1973 –  Mikhail Tal
1974 –  Walter Browne
1975 –  Lajos Portisch (3)
1976 –  Ljubomir Ljubojević and  Friðrik Ólafsson (2)
1977 –  Genna Sosonko and  Efim Geller (3)
1978 –  Lajos Portisch (4)
1979 –  Lev Polugaevsky (2)
1980 –  Walter Browne (2) and  Yasser Seirawan
1981 –  Genna Sosonko (2) and  Jan Timman
1982 –  John Nunn and  Yuri Balashov
1983 –  Ulf Andersson
1984 –  Alexander Beliavsky and  Viktor Korchnoi (3)
1985 –  Jan Timman (2)
1986 –  Nigel Short
1987 –  Nigel Short (2) and  Viktor Korchnoi (4)
1988 –  Anatoly Karpov
1989 –  Viswanathan Anand,  Predrag Nikolić,  Zoltán Ribli and  Gyula Sax
1990 –  John Nunn (2)
1991 –  John Nunn (3)
1992 –  Valery Salov and  Boris Gelfand 
1993 –  Anatoly Karpov (2)
1994 –  Predrag Nikolić (2)
1995 –  Alexey Dreev
1996 –  Vasyl Ivanchuk
1997 –  Valery Salov (2)
1998 –  Vladimir Kramnik and  Viswanathan Anand (2)
1999 –  Garry Kasparov

Corus tournament
From 2000, the popular name for the tournament was more or less equally shared between "Wijk aan Zee" and "Corus".
2000 –  Garry Kasparov (2)
2001 –  Garry Kasparov (3)
2002 –  Evgeny Bareev
2003 –  Viswanathan Anand (3)
2004 –  Viswanathan Anand (4)
2005 –  Peter Leko
2006 –  Viswanathan Anand (5) and  Veselin Topalov
2007 –  Levon Aronian,  Veselin Topalov (2) and  Teimour Radjabov 
2008 –  Levon Aronian (2) and  Magnus Carlsen
2009 –  Sergey Karjakin
2010 –  Magnus Carlsen (2)

Tata Steel tournament

From 2011, the popular name for the tournament was changed from 'Corus' to 'Tata Steel'.
2011 –  Hikaru Nakamura
2012 –  Levon Aronian (3)
2013 –  Magnus Carlsen (3)
2014 –  Levon Aronian (4)
2015 –  Magnus Carlsen (4)
2016 –  Magnus Carlsen (5)
2017 –  Wesley So
2018 –  Magnus Carlsen (6)
2019 –  Magnus Carlsen (7)
2020 –  Fabiano Caruana
2021 –  Jorden van Foreest
2022 –  Magnus Carlsen (8)
2023 –  Anish Giri

Multiple winners
Until recently, players ending on the same score shared the title.

The first tie-break was held in 2018, with Magnus Carlsen defeating Anish Giri 1½–½. The two players sharing first place after the regular games play two Blitz games and then possibly also an Armageddon game to decide a sole winner.

Event crosstables

1980s 
Event crosstables 1983 and following: Hoogovens Wijk aan Zee Chess Tournament 1983

1990s 
Event crosstables 1990 and following: Hoogovens Wijk aan Zee Chess Tournament 1990

2000s 
Event crosstables 2000 and following: Corus Chess Tournament 2000

2003 
{| class="wikitable" style="text-align: center;"
|+ 65th Corus Chess Tournament, grandmaster group A, 11–26 January 2003, Wijk aan Zee, Cat. XIX (2701)
! !! Player !! Rating !! 1 !! 2 !! 3 !! 4 !! 5 !! 6 !! 7 !! 8 !! 9 !! 10 !! 11 !! 12 !! 13 !! 14 !! Total !! SB !! TPR
|-
|-style="background:#ccffcc;"
| 1 || align=left| || 2753 ||  || ½ || ½ || 1 || ½ || ½ || ½ || ½ || ½ || 1 || 1 || 1 || ½ || ½ || 8½ || || 2806
|-
| 2 || align="left" | || 2700 || ½ ||  || ½ || ½ || ½ || 1 || ½ || ½ || ½ || ½ || 1 || ½ || ½ || 1 || 8 || || 2788
|-
| 3 || align="left" | || 2729 || ½ || ½ ||  || 0 || 0 || 1 || 1 || 0 || 1 || ½ || ½ || 1 || ½ || 1 || 7½ || || 2755
|-
| 4 || align="left" | || 2723 || 0 || ½ || 1 ||  || 1 || 0 || ½ || 1 || ½ || ½ || ½ || 1 || 0 || ½ || 7 || 45.75 || 2728
|-
| 5 || align="left" | || 2668 || ½ || ½ || 1 || 0 ||  || ½ || ½ || 1 || ½ || 1 || 0 || 0 || ½ || 1 || 7 || 44.25 || 2732
|-
| 6 || align="left" | || 2712 || ½ || 0 || 0 || 1 || ½ ||  || ½ || ½ || 1 || ½ || ½ || ½ || 1 || ½ || 7 || 43.25 || 2729
|-
| 7 || align="left" | || 2699 || ½ || ½ || 0 || ½ || ½ || ½ ||  || ½ || ½ || ½ || ½ || 1 || ½ || 1 || 7 || 42.50 || 2730
|-
| 8 || align="left" | || 2807 || ½ || ½ || 1 || 0 || 0 || ½ || ½ ||  || ½ || 1 || ½ || 0 || 1 || 1 || 7 || 42.50 || 2721
|-
| 9 || align="left" | || 2624 || ½ || ½ || 0 || ½ || ½ || 0 || ½ || ½ ||  || 0 || ½ || 1 || 1 || 1 || 6½ || 38.25 || 2706
|-
| 10 || align="left" | || 2743 || 0 || ½ || ½ || ½ || 0 || ½ || ½ || 0 || 1 ||  || ½ || ½ || 1 || 1 || 6½ || 37.75 || 2697
|-
| 11 || align="left" | || 2688 || 0 || 0 || ½ || ½ || 1 || ½ || ½ || ½ || ½ || ½ ||  || 0 || 1 || ½ || 6 || 37.00 || 2672
|- 
| 12 || align="left" | || 2734 || 0 || ½ || 0 || 0 || 1 || ½ || 0 || 1 || 0 || ½ || 1 ||  || ½ || 1 || 6 || 35.50 || 2669
|-
| 13 || align="left" | || 2633 || ½ || ½ || ½ || 1 || ½ || 0 || ½ || 0 || 0 || 0 || 0 || ½ ||  || ½ || 4½ || || 2596
|-
| 14 || align="left" | || 2594 || ½ || 0 || 0 || ½ || 0 || ½ || 0 || 0 || 0 || 0 || ½ || 0 || ½ ||  || 2½ || || 2458
|}

{| class="wikitable" style="text-align: center;"
|+ 65th Corus Chess Tournament, grandmaster group B, 11–26 January 2003, Wijk aan Zee, Cat. XI (2525)
! !! Player !! Rating !! 1 !! 2 !! 3 !! 4 !! 5 !! 6 !! 7 !! 8 !! 9 !! 10 !! 11 !! 12 !! 13 !! 14 !! Total !! SB !! TPR
|-
| 1 || align=left| || 2624 ||  || 1 || 1 || 1 || ½ || 1 || ½ || 1 || 1 || 0 || 1 || 1 || 1 || 1 || 11 || || 2813
|-
| 2 || align="left" | || 2427 || 0 ||  || 1 || ½ || ½ || ½ || ½ || 0 || 1 || 1 || 1 || 1 || 1 || 0 || 8 || 48.50 || 2620
|-
| 3 || align="left" | || 2585 || 0 || 0 ||  || 1 || 1 || 1 || 0 || ½ || 1 || ½ || 1 || 1 || 0 || 1 || 8 || 47.25 || 2607
|-
| 4 || align="left" | || 2553 || 0 || ½ || 0 ||  || 0 || 0 || 1 || 1 || ½ || ½ || 1 || 1 || 1 || 1 || 7½ || || 2580
|-
| 5 || align="left" | || 2547 || ½ || ½ || 0 || 1 ||  || ½ || ½ || ½ || ½ || 1 || ½ || ½ || 1 || 0 || 7 || || 2552
|-
| 6 || align="left" | || 2504 || 0 || ½ || 0 || 1 || ½ ||  || ½ || ½ || 1 || ½ || 0 || 0 || 1 || 1 || 6½ || || 2527
|-
| 7 || align="left" | || 2623 || ½ || ½ || 1 || 0 || ½ || ½ ||  || 1 || 0 || 0 || 1 || 0 || ½ || ½ || 6 || 40.25 || 2489
|-
| 8 || align="left" | || 2509 || 0 || 1 || ½ || 0 || ½ || ½ || 0 ||  || ½ || ½ || ½ || 1 || ½ || ½ || 6 || 36.75 || 2497
|-
| 9 || align="left" | || 2496 || 0 || 0 || 0 || ½ || ½ || 0 || 1 || ½ ||  || 1 || 0 || ½ || 1 || 1 || 6 || 33.25 || 2498
|-
| 10 || align="left" | || 2569 || 1 || 0 || ½ || ½ || 0 || ½ || 1 || ½ || 0 ||  || ½ || 0 || ½ || ½ || 5½ || 38.25 || 2465
|-
| 11 || align="left" | || 2570 || 0 || 0 || 0 || 0 || ½ || 1 || 0 || ½ || 1 || ½ ||  || ½ || ½ || 1 || 5½ || 30.75 || 2465
|- 
| 12 || align="left" | || 2456 || 0 || 0 || 0 || 0 || ½ || 1 || 1 || 0 || ½ || 1 || ½ ||  || 0 || ½ || 5 || 29.25 || 2443
|-
| 13 || align="left" | || 2436 || 0 || 0 || 1 || 0 || 0 || 0 || ½ || ½ || 0 || ½ || ½ || 1 ||  || 1 || 5 || 28.50 || 2445
|-
| 14 || align="left" | || 2452 || 0 || 1 || 0 || 0 || 1 || 0 || ½ || ½ || 0 || ½ || 0 || ½ || 0 ||  || 4 || || 2390
|}

{| class="wikitable" style="text-align: center;"
|+ 65th Corus Chess Tournament, invitation tens, 17–26 January 2003, Wijk aan Zee, Cat. VIII (2434)
! !! Player !! Rating !! 1 !! 2 !! 3 !! 4 !! 5 !! 6 !! 7 !! 8 !! 9 !! 10 !! Total !! SB !! TPR
|-
| 1 || align=left| || 2506 ||  || 0 || 1 || ½ || ½ || 1 || 1 || 1 || 1 || 1 || 7 || || 2646
|-
| 2 || align="left" | || 2470 || 1 ||  || ½ || 0 || ½ || 1 || ½ || 1 || 1 || 1 || 6½ || 25.00 || 2596
|-
| 3 || align="left" | || 2569 || 0 || ½ ||  || 1 || 1 || ½ || 1 || ½ || 1 || 1 || 6½ || 24.25 || 2585
|-
| 4 || align="left" | || 2504 || ½ || 1 || 0 ||  || ½ || 1 || ½ || 1 || ½ || 1 || 6 || || 2551
|-
| 5 || align="left" | || 2527 || ½ || ½ || 0 || ½ ||  || ½ || 1 || ½ || 1 || 1 || 5½ || || 2503
|-
| 6 || align="left" | || 2438 || 0 || 0 || ½ || 0 || ½ ||  || 1 || 1 || 1 || 1 || 5 || || 2476
|-
| 7 || align="left" | || 2417 || 0 || ½ || 0 || ½ || 0 || 0 ||  || ½ || ½ || 1 || 3 || 9.50 || 2310
|-
| 8 || align="left" | || 2342 || 0 || 0 || ½ || 0 || ½ || 0 || ½ ||  || ½ || 1 || 3 || 9.25 || 2319
|-
| 9 || align="left" | || 2325 || 0 || 0 || 0 || ½ || 0 || 0 || ½ || ½ ||  || 0 || 1½ || || 2173
|-
| 10 || align="left" | || 2238 || 0 || 0 || 0 || 0 || 0 || 0 || 0 || 0 || 1 ||  || 1 || || 2104
|}

2004 
{| class="wikitable" style="text-align: center;"
|+ 66th Corus Chess Tournament, grandmaster group A, 10–25 January 2004, Wijk aan Zee, Cat. XIX (2702)
! !! Player !! Rating !! 1 !! 2 !! 3 !! 4 !! 5 !! 6 !! 7 !! 8 !! 9 !! 10 !! 11 !! 12 !! 13 !! 14 !! Total !! SB !! TPR
|-
|-style="background:#ccffcc;"
| 1 || align=left| || 2766 ||  || ½ || ½ || 0 || ½ || ½ || 1 || ½ || ½ || 1 || 1 || ½ || 1 || 1 || 8½ || || 2808
|-
| 2 || align="left" | || 2722 || ½ ||  || ½ || ½ || 1 || ½ || ½ || ½ || ½ || ½ || ½ || ½ || 1 || 1 || 8 || 49.75 || 2788
|-
| 3 || align="left" | || 2720 || ½ || ½ ||  || ½ || ½ || 1 || 1 || 0 || ½ || ½ || ½ || ½ || 1 || 1 || 8 || 49.25 || 2788
|-
| 4 || align="left" | || 2735 || 1 || ½ || ½ ||  || 1 || ½ || 0 || ½ || 0 || 1 || ½ || ½ || ½ || 1 || 7½ || 48.50 || 2757
|-
| 5 || align="left" | || 2679 || ½ || 0 || ½ || 0 ||  || ½ || ½ || 1 || 1 || 1 || 1 || 1 || ½ || 0 || 7½ || 46.75	|| 2761
|-
| 6 || align="left" | || 2777 || ½ || ½ || 0 || ½ || ½ ||  || ½ || 1 || 1 || 0 || ½ || 0 || 1 || ½ || 6½ || 41.50 || 2697
|-
| 7 || align="left" | || 2714 || 0 || ½ || 0 || 1 || ½ || ½ ||  || ½ || 0 || 1 || 1 || 1 || ½ || 0 || 6½ || 41.25|| 2702
|-
| 8 || align="left" | || 2617 || ½ || ½ || 1 || ½ || 0 || 0 || ½ ||  || ½ || ½ || ½  || ½ || ½ || 1 || 6½ || 41.25 || 2709
|-
| 9 || align="left" | || 2747 || ½ || ½ || ½ || 1 || 0 || 0 || 1 || ½ ||  || 0 || ½ || ½ || ½ || ½ || 6 || 39.50 || 2670
|-
| 10 || align="left" | || 2693 || 0 || ½ || ½ || 0 || 0 || 1 || ½ || ½ || ½ ||  || ½ || 1 || 1 || 1 || 6 || 36.25 || 2674
|-
| 11 || align="left" | || 2736 || 0 || ½ || ½ || ½ || 0 || ½ || 0 || ½ || ½ || ½ ||  || 1 || ½ || 1 || 6 || 35.75 || 2671
|- 
| 12 || align="left" | || 2706 || ½ || ½ || ½ || ½ || 0 || 1 || 0 || ½  || ½ || 0 || 0 ||  || ½ || ½ || 5 || 33.25 || 2615
|-
| 13 || align="left" | || 2644 || 0 || 0 || 0 || ½ || ½ || 0 || ½ || ½ || ½ || ½ || ½ || ½ ||  || 1 || 5 || 29.50 || 2620
|-
| 14 || align="left" | || 2578 || 0 || 0 || 0 || 0 || 1 || ½ || 1 || 0 || ½ || ½ || 0 || ½ || 0 ||  || 4 || || 2571
|}

{| class="wikitable" style="text-align: center;"
|+ 66th Corus Chess Tournament, grandmaster group B, 10–25 January 2004, Wijk aan Zee, Cat. XIII (2560)
! !! Player !! Rating !! 1 !! 2 !! 3 !! 4 !! 5 !! 6 !! 7 !! 8 !! 9 !! 10 !! 11 !! 12 !! 13 !! 14 !! Total !! SB !! TPR
|-
| 1 || align=left| || 2603 ||  || ½ || ½ || 0 || ½ || 1 || 1 || ½ || 0 || 1 || 1 || 1 || 1 || 1 || 9 || || 2698
|-
| 2 || align="left" | || 2605 || ½ ||  || ½ || ½ || 1 || ½ || ½ || ½ || ½ || ½ || 1 || 1 || ½ || 1 || 8½ || || 2667
|-
| 3 || align="left" | || 2636 || ½ || ½ ||  || 0 || 1 || 0 || 0 || 1 || ½ || 1 || 1 || 1 || 1 || ½ || 8 || || 2641
|-
| 4 || align="left" | || 2571 || 1 || ½ || 1 ||  || 0 || ½ || 0 || 1 || ½ || ½ || ½ || 1 || 1 || 0 || 7½ || 49.25 || 2616
|-
| 5 || align="left" | || 2581 || ½ || 0 || 0 || 1 ||  || ½ || 1 || 1 || 1 || 0 || ½ || 0 || 1 || 1 || 7½ || 46.25 || 2616
|-
| 6 || align="left" | || 2489 || 0 || ½ || 1 || ½ || ½ ||  || ½ || 1 || 0 || 1 || ½ || 0 || ½ || ½ || 6½ || 42.25 || 2566
|-
| 7 || align="left" | || 2576 || 0 || ½ || 1 || 1 || 0 || ½ ||  || ½ || 1 || 0 || 0 || 1 || 0 || 1 || 6½ || 41.75 || 2559
|-
| 8 || align="left" | || 2600 || ½ || ½ || 0 || 0 || 0 || 0 || ½ ||  || 1 || ½ || 1 || 1 || ½ || 1 || 6½ || 37.75 || 2557
|-
| 9 || align="left" | || 2478 || 1 || ½ || ½ || ½ || 0 || 1 || 0 || 0 ||  || ½ || ½ || 0 || ½ || 1 || 6 || || 2537
|-
| 10 || align="left" | || 2490 || 0 || ½ || 0 || ½ || 1 || 0 || 1 || ½ || ½ ||  || 0 || 0 || 1 || ½ || 5½ || || 2509
|-
| 11 || align="left" | || 2588 || 0 || 0 || 0 || ½ || ½ || ½ || 1 || 0 || ½ || 1 ||  || ½ || 0 || ½ || 5 || 30.50 || 2471
|- 
| 12 || align="left" | || 2586 || 0 || 0 || 0 || 0 || 1 || 1 || 0 || 0 || 1 || 1 || ½ ||  || ½ || 0 || 5 || 30.50 || 2471
|-
| 13 || align="left" | || 2497 || 0 || ½ || 0 || 0 || 0 || ½ || 1 || ½ || ½ || 0 || 1 || ½ ||  || ½ || 5 || 30.00 || 2478
|-
| 14 || align="left" | || 2542 || 0 || 0 || ½ || 1 || 0 || ½ || 0 || 0 || 0 || ½ || ½ || 1 || ½ ||  || 4½ || || 2452
|}

{| class="wikitable" style="text-align: center;"
|+ 66th Corus Chess Tournament, grandmaster group C, 10–25 January 2004, Wijk aan Zee, Cat. IX (2454)
! !! Player !! Rating !! 1 !! 2 !! 3 !! 4 !! 5 !! 6 !! 7 !! 8 !! 9 !! 10 !! 11 !! 12 !! 13 !! 14 !! Total !! SB !! TPR
|-
| 1 || align=left| || 2484 ||  || 1 || ½ || 1 || 1 || 1 || 1 || 0 || ½ || ½ || 1 || 1 || 1 || 1 || 10½ || || 2702
|-
| 2 || align="left" | || 2474 || 0 ||  || 1 || 1 || ½ || ½ || 1 || ½ || ½ || 1 || 1 || 1 || 1 || 1 || 10 || || 2663
|-
| 3 || align="left" | || 2505 || ½ || 0 ||  || ½ || 1 || ½ || 0 || 1 || 1 || 1 || ½ || 1 || 1 || 1 || 9 || || 2591
|-
| 4 || align="left" | || 2548 || 0 || 0 || ½ ||  || ½ || ½ || 1 || 0 || ½ || 1 || 1 || 1 || 1 || 1 || 8 || 40.00 || 2533
|-
| 5 || align="left" | || 2407 || 0 || ½ || 0 || ½ ||  || 0 || ½ || ½ || 1 || 1 || 1 || 1 || 1 || 1 || 8 || 39.75 || 2544
|-
| 6 || align="left" | || 2583 || 0 || ½ || ½ || ½ || 1 ||  || ½ || 1 || ½ || 0 || 1 || 0 || 1 || 1 || 7½ || 43.00 || 2501
|-
| 7 || align="left" | || 2323 || 0 || 0 || 1 || 0 || ½ || ½ ||  || 1 || ½ || 1 || 0 || 1 || 1 || 1 || 7½ || 38.00 || 2521
|-
| 8 || align="left" | || 2615 || 1 || ½ || 0 || 1 || ½ || 0 || 0 ||  || 0 || ½ || ½ || 1 || 1 || 1 || 7 || || 2470
|-
| 9 || align="left" | || 2493 || ½ || ½ || 0 || ½ || 0 || ½ || ½ || 1 ||  || ½ || ½ || 0 || 1 || 1 || 6½ || || 2451
|-
| 10 || align="left" | || 2489 || ½ || 0 || 0 || 0 || 0 || 1 || 0 || ½ || ½ ||  || ½ || 1 || 1 || 1 || 6 || 27.25 || 2422
|-
| 11 || align="left" | || 2580 || 0 || 0 || ½ || 0 || 0 || 0 || 1 || ½ || ½ || ½ ||  || 1 || 1 || 1 || 6 || 26.75 || 2415
|- 
| 12 || align="left" | || 2419 || 0 || 0 || 0 || 0 || 0 || 1 || 0 || 0 || 1 || 0 || 0 ||  || ½ || 1 || 3½ || || 2281
|-
| 13 || align="left" | || 2225 || 0 || 0 || 0 || 0 || 0 || 0 || 0 || 0 || 0 || 0 || 0 || ½ ||  || ½ || 1 || || 2070
|-
| 14 || align="left" | || 2206 || 0 || 0 || 0 || 0 || 0 || 0 || 0 || 0 || 0 || 0 || 0 || 0 || ½ ||  || ½ || || 1972
|}

2005 
{| class="wikitable" style="text-align: center;"
|+ 67th Corus Chess Tournament, grandmaster group A, 15–30 January 2005, Wijk aan Zee, Cat. XIX (2721)
! !! Player !! Rating !! 1 !! 2 !! 3 !! 4 !! 5 !! 6 !! 7 !! 8 !! 9 !! 10 !! 11 !! 12 !! 13 !! 14 !! Total !! SB !! TPR
|-
|-style="background:#ccffcc;"
| 1 || align=left| || 2749 ||  || 1 || ½ || ½ || ½ || ½ || ½ || ½ || ½ || 1 || 1 || 1 || ½ || ½ || 8½ || || 2829
|-
| 2 || align="left" | || 2786 || 0 ||  || ½ || ½ || ½ || 1 || ½ || ½ || 1 || 1 || ½ || ½ || 1 || ½ || 8 || || 2803
|-
| 3 || align="left" | || 2757 || ½ || ½ ||  || 0 || ½ || 0 || 1 || ½ || 1 || 1 || ½ || 1 || ½ || ½ || 7½ || || 2775
|-
| 4 || align="left" | || 2728 || ½ || ½ || 1 ||  || ½ || ½ || ½ || ½ || 0 || ½ || 1 || ½ || 0 || 1 || 7 || 45.00 || 2749
|-
| 5 || align="left" | || 2710 || ½ || ½ || ½ || ½ ||  || ½ || ½ || ½ || 1 || ½ || 0 || ½ || 1 || ½ || 7 || 44.50 || 2751
|-
| 6 || align="left" | || 2741 || ½ || 0 || 1 || ½ || ½ ||  || ½ || ½ || ½ || ½ || ½ || ½ || 1 || ½ || 7 || 44.00 || 2748
|-
| 7 || align="left" | || 2754 || ½ || ½ || 0 || ½ || ½ || ½ ||  || ½ || ½ || ½ || 1 || ½ || ½ || 1 || 7 || 43.00 || 2747
|-
| 8 || align="left" | || 2679 || ½ || ½ || ½ || ½ || ½ || ½ || ½ ||  || ½ || ½ || 0 || 1 || ½ || ½ || 6½ || 42.00 || 2724
|-
| 9 || align="left" | || 2700 || ½ || 0 || 0 || 1 || 0 || ½ || ½ || ½ ||  || ½ || ½ || ½ || 1 || 1 || 6½ || 38.50 || 2722
|-
| 10 || align="left" | || 2652 || 0 || 0 || 0 || ½ || ½ || ½ || ½ || ½ || ½ ||  || ½ || 1 || 1 || 1 || 6½ || 37.00 || 2726
|-
| 11 || align="left" | || 2735 || 0 || ½ || ½ || 0 || 1 || ½ || 0 || 1 || ½ || ½ ||  || ½ || ½ || ½ || 6 || || 2691
|- 
| 12 || align="left" | || 2674 || 0 || ½ || 0 || ½ || ½ || ½ || ½ || 0 || ½ || 0 || ½ ||  || 1 || 1 || 5½ || || 2667
|-
| 13 || align="left" | || 2741 || ½ || 0 || ½ || 1 || 0 || 0 || ½ || ½ || 0 || 0 || ½ || 0 ||  || 1 || 4½ || || 2609
|-
| 14 || align="left" | || 2685 || ½ || ½ || ½ || 0 || ½ || ½ || 0 || ½ || 0 || 0 || ½ || 0 || 0 ||  || 3½ || || 2549
|}

{| class="wikitable" style="text-align: center;"
|+ 67th Corus Chess Tournament, grandmaster group B, 15–30 January 2005, Wijk aan Zee, Cat. XIII (2564)
! !! Player !! Rating !! 1 !! 2 !! 3 !! 4 !! 5 !! 6 !! 7 !! 8 !! 9 !! 10 !! 11 !! 12 !! 13 !! 14 !! Total !! SB !! TPR
|-
| 1 || align=left| || 2599 ||  || ½ || ½ || 0 || 1 || ½ || ½ || 1 || ½ || 1 || 1 || 1 || 1 || 1 || 9½ || || 2737
|-
| 2 || align="left" | || 2475 || ½ ||  || 1 || 0 || ½ || ½ || 1 || ½ || 1 || ½ || 1 || ½ || ½ || 1 || 8½ || 52.00 || 2681
|-
| 3 || align="left" | || 2657 || ½ || 0 ||  || ½ || 0 || ½ || ½ || ½ || 1 || 1 || 1 || 1 || 1 || 1 || 8½ || 47.25 || 2667
|-
| 4 || align="left" | || 2648 || 1 || 1 || ½ ||  || 0 || ½ || ½ || 1 || ½ || ½ || 1 || ½ || ½ || ½ || 8 || || 2645
|-
| 5 || align="left" | || 2572 || 0 || ½ || 1 || 1 ||  || ½ || 0 || ½ || 1 || ½ || ½ || 1 || ½ || ½ || 7½ || 47.00 || 2621
|-
| 6 || align="left" | || 2652 || ½ || ½ || ½ || ½ || ½ ||  || ½ || 1 || ½ || 0 || ½ || 1 || ½ || 1 || 7½ || 46.00 || 2615
|-
| 7 || align="left" | || 2553 || ½ || 0 || ½ || ½ || 1 || ½ ||  || ½ || ½ || 1 || ½ || 0 || 1 || ½ || 7 || || 2594
|-
| 8 || align="left" | || 2524 || 0 || ½ || ½ || 0 || ½ || 0 || ½ ||  || ½ || 1 || 1 || ½ || 1 || ½ || 6½ || || 2568
|-
| 9 || align="left" | || 2491 || ½ || 0 || 0 || ½ || 0 || ½ || ½ || ½ ||  || ½ || 1 || 0 || 1 || 1 || 6 || || 2541
|-
| 10 || align="left" | || 2490 || 0 || ½ || 0 || ½ || ½ || 1 || 0 || 0 || ½ ||  || ½ || ½ || ½ || 1 || 5½ || || 2513
|-
| 11 || align="left" | || 2509 || 0 || 0 || 0 || 0 || ½ || ½ || ½ || 0 || 0 || ½ ||  || 1 || 1 || 1 || 5 || || 2482
|- 
| 12 || align="left" | || 2549 || 0 || ½ || 0 || ½ || 0 || 0 || 1 || ½ || 1 || ½ || 0 ||  || 0 || ½ || 4½ || || 2456
|-
| 13 || align="left" | || 2676 || 0 || ½ || 0 || ½ || ½ || ½ || 0 || 0 || 0 || ½ || 0 || 1 ||  ||  ½|| 4 || || 2415
|-
| 14 || align="left" | || 2507 || 0 || 0 || 0 || ½ || ½ || 0 || ½ || ½ || 0 ||  0|| 0 || ½ || ½ ||  || 3 ||  || 2358
|}

{| class="wikitable" style="text-align: center;"
|+ 67th Corus Chess Tournament, grandmaster group C, 15–30 January 2005, Wijk aan Zee, Cat. VII (2422)
! !! Player !! Rating !! 1 !! 2 !! 3 !! 4 !! 5 !! 6 !! 7 !! 8 !! 9 !! 10 !! 11 !! 12 !! 13 !! 14 !! Total !! SB !! TPR
|-
| 1 || align=left| || 2517 ||  || ½ || ½ || 1 || ½ || ½ || 1 || 1 || 1 || 1 || 1 || 1 || ½ || 1 || 10½ || || 2665
|-
| 2 || align="left" | || 2603 || ½ ||  || 1 || 0 || ½ || ½ || 1 || 1 || ½ || 1 || 1 || 1 || 1 || 1 || 10 || 56.50 || 2619
|-
| 3 || align="left" | || 2465 || ½ || 0 ||  || ½ || ½ || 1 || ½ || 1 || 1 || 1 || 1 || 1 || 1 || 1 || 10 || 53.50 || 2629
|-
| 4 || align="left" | || 2531 || 0 || 1 || ½ ||  || ½ || 1 || 1 || 1 || ½ || ½ || 1 || 1 || 0 || 1 || 9 || 53.50 || 2554
|-
| 5 || align="left" | || 2605 || ½ || ½ || ½ || ½ ||  || 1 || 1 || 1 || 0 || ½ || 1 || 1 || 1 || ½ || 9 || 53.50 || 2548
|-
| 6 || align="left" | || 2399 || ½ || ½ || 0 || 0 || 0 ||  || 0 || 0 || 1 || 1 || 1 || ½ || 1 || 1 || 6½ || 32.25 || 2423
|-
| 7 || align="left" | || 2381 || 0 || 0 || ½ || 0 || 0 || 1 ||  || ½ || ½ || 1 || 0 || 1 || 1 || 1 || 6½ || 31.75 || 2425
|-
| 8 || align="left" | || 2316 || 0 || 0 || 0 || 0 || 0 || 1 || ½ ||  || ½ || ½ || 1 || 1 || 0 || 1 || 5½ || || 2373
|-
| 9 || align="left" | || 2383 || 0 || ½ || 0 || ½ || 1 || 0 || ½ || ½ ||  || ½ || 1 || ½ || 0 || 0 || 5 || 33.00 || 2337
|-
| 10 || align="left" | || 2426 || 0 || 0 || 0 || ½ || ½ || 0 || 0 || ½ || ½ ||  || 0 || 1 || 1 || 1 || 5 || 24.25 || 2334
|-
| 11 || align="left" | || 2366 || 0 || 0 || 0 || 0 || 0 || 0 || 1 || 0 || 0 || 1 ||  || 0 || 1 || 1 || 4 || 17.50 || 2285
|- 
| 12 || align="left" | || 2349 || 0 || 0 || 0 || 0 || 0 || ½ || 0 || 0 || ½ || 0 || 1 ||  || 1 || 1 || 4 || 15.75 || 2286
|-
| 13 || align="left" | || 2295 || ½ || 0 || 0 || 1 || 0 || 0 || 0 || 1 || 1 || 0 || 0 || 0 ||  || 0 || 3½ || || 2256
|-
| 14 || align="left" | || 2265 || 0 || 0 || 0 || 0 || ½ || 0 || 0 || 0 || 1 || 0 || 0 || 0 || 1 ||  || 2½ || || 2183
|}

2006 
{| class="wikitable" style="text-align: center;"
|+ 68th Corus Chess Tournament, grandmaster group A, 14–29 January 2006, Wijk aan Zee, Cat. XIX (2716)
! !! Player !! Rating !! 1 !! 2 !! 3 !! 4 !! 5 !! 6 !! 7 !! 8 !! 9 !! 10 !! 11 !! 12 !! 13 !! 14 !! Total !! SB !! TPR
|-
|-style="background:#ccffcc;"
| 1 || align=left| || 2792 ||  || ½ || ½ || 1 || 1 || 1 || ½ || 1 || ½ || 1 || 1 || ½ || 0 || ½ || 9 || 58.50 || 2851
|-
|-style="background:#ccffcc;"
| 2 || align="left" | || 2801 || ½ ||  || 0 || ½ || ½ || 1 || ½ || ½ || 1 || 1 || 1 || ½ || 1 || 1 || 9 || 54.00 || 2850
|-
| 3 || align="left" | || 2707 || ½ || 1 ||  || 1 || 0 || ½ || ½ || ½ || ½ || ½ || ½ || ½ || 1 || ½ || 7½ || 48.75 || 2773
|-
| 4 || align="left" | || 2729 || 0 || ½ || 0 ||  || ½ || 1 || ½ || ½ || 1 || ½ || ½ || ½ || 1 || 1 || 7½ || 44.50 || 2772
|-
| 5 || align="left" | || 2723 || 0 || ½ || 1 || ½ ||  || ½ || ½ || ½ || ½ || ½ || 1 || ½ || 0 || 1 || 7 || 43.75 || 2744
|-
| 6 || align="left" | || 2660 || 0 || 0 || ½ || 0 || ½ ||  || ½ || ½ || ½ || ½ || 1 || 1 || 1 || 1 || 7 || 38.50 || 2749
|-
| 7 || align="left" | || 2669 || ½ || ½ || ½ || ½ || ½ || ½ ||  || ½ || ½ || ½ || 0 || ½ || 1 || ½ || 6½ || 41.75 || 2719
|-
| 8 || align="left" | || 2740 || 0 || ½ || ½ || ½ || ½ || ½ || ½ ||  || ½ || 0 || ½ || 1 || 1 || ½ || 6½ || 39.25 || 2714
|-
| 9 || align="left" | || 2752 || ½ || 0 || ½ || 0 || ½ || ½ || ½ || ½ ||  || 0 || ½ || 1 || 1 || 1 || 6½ || 37.50 || 2713
|-
| 10 || align="left" | || 2647 || 0 || 0 || ½ || ½ || ½ || ½ || ½ || 1 || 1 ||  || ½ || ½ || 0 || ½ || 6 || || 2692
|-
| 11 || align="left" | || 2717 || 0 || 0 || ½ || ½ || 0 || 0 || 1 || ½ || ½ || ½ ||  || ½ || 1 || ½ || 5½ || || 2659
|- 
| 12 || align="left" | || 2709 || ½ || ½ || ½ || ½ || ½ || 0 || ½ || 0 || 0 || ½ || ½ ||  || 0 || ½ || 4½ || 31.00 || 2606
|-
| 13 || align="left" | || 2686 || 1 || 0 || 0 || 0 || 1 || 0 || 0 || 0 || 0 || 1 || 0 || 1 ||  || ½ || 4½ || 28.50 || 2608
|-
| 14 || align="left" | || 2689 || ½ || 0 || ½ || 0 || 0 || 0 || ½ || ½ || 0 || ½ || ½ || ½ || ½ ||  || 4 || || 2577
|}

{| class="wikitable" style="text-align: center;"
|+ 68th Corus Chess Tournament, grandmaster group B, 14–29 January 2006, Wijk aan Zee, Cat. XV (2602)
! !! Player !! Rating !! 1 !! 2 !! 3 !! 4 !! 5 !! 6 !! 7 !! 8 !! 9 !! 10 !! 11 !! 12 !! 13 !! 14 !! Total !! SB !! TPR
|-
| 1 || align=left| || 2638 ||  || 1 || 0 || 1 || ½ || 1 || ½ || 1 || ½ || 1 || 1 || ½ || ½ || ½ ||9 || 58.25 || 2741
|-
| 2 || align=left| || 2625 || 0 ||  || ½ || ½ || ½ || ½ || 1 || 1 || 1 || 1 || ½ || 1 || ½ || 1 ||9 || 53.00 || 2742
|-
| 3 || align=left| || 2646 || 1 || ½ ||  || 0 || ½ || 0 || ½ || 1 || 0 || 1 || 1 || 1 || 1 || 1 ||8½ ||  || 2709
|-
| 4 || align=left| || 2614 || 0 || ½|| 1 ||  || ½ || 1 || ½ || 1|| 0 || 0 || ½ || 1 || 1 || 1 ||8 ||  || 2689
|-
| 5 || align=left| || 2660 || ½ || ½ || ½ || ½ ||  || 0 || ½ || ½ || ½ || ½ || 1 || 1 || 1 || ½ ||7½ ||  || 2655
|-
| 6 || align=left| || 2625 || 0 || ½ || 1 || 0 || 1 ||  || ½ || 1 || 0 || ½ || 0 || ½ || 1 || 1 ||7 || 41.50 || 2630
|-
| 7 || align=left| || 2550 || ½ || 0 || ½ || ½ || ½ || ½ ||  || 0 || ½ || 1 || 1 || ½ || ½ || 1 ||7 || 41.25 || 2635
|-
| 8 || align=left| || 2657 || 0 || 0 || 0 || 0 || ½  || 0 || 1 ||  || 1 || ½ || 1 || 1 || 1 || 1 ||7 || 35.75 || 2627
|-
| 9 || align=left| || 2626 || ½ || 0 || 1 || 1 || ½ || 1 || ½ || 0 ||  || ½ || ½ || ½ || ½ || 0 ||6½ || || 2601
|-
| 10 || align=left| || 2633 || 0 || 0 || 0 || 1 || ½ || ½ || 0 || ½ || ½ ||  || ½ || 1 || 1 || ½ ||6 || 33.25 || 2571
|-
| 11 || align=left| || 2537 || 0 || ½ || 0 || ½ || 0 || 1 || 0 || 0 || ½ || ½ ||  || 1 || 1 || 1 ||6 || 31.25 || 2578
|-
| 12 || align=left| || 2550 || ½ || 0 || 0 || 0 || 0 || ½ || ½ || 0 || ½ || 0 || 0 ||  || 1 || 1 ||4 ||  || 2465
|-
| 13 || align=left| || 2573 || ½ || ½ || 0 || 0 || 0 || 0 || ½ || 0 || ½ || 0 || 0 || 0 ||  || 1 ||3 ||  || 2394
|-
| 14 || align=left| || 2500 || ½ || 0 || 0 || 0 || ½ || 0 || 0 || 0 || 1 || ½ || 0 || 0 || 0 ||  ||2½ ||  || 2359
|}

{| class="wikitable" style="text-align: center;"
|+ 68th Corus Chess Tournament, grandmaster group C, 14–29 January 2006, Wijk aan Zee, Cat. IX (2458)
! !! Player !! Rating !! 1 !! 2 !! 3 !! 4 !! 5 !! 6 !! 7 !! 8 !! 9 !! 10 !! 11 !! 12 !! 13 !! 14 !! Total !! SB !! TPR
|-
| 1 || align=left| || 2618 ||  || ½ || 1 || ½ || 1 || 1 || ½ || ½ || 1 || 1 || 1 || ½ || 1 || 1 || 10½ || || 2696
|-
| 2 || align="left" | || 2514 || ½ ||  || ½ || ½ || 1 || ½ || ½ || 1 || 1 || 0 || 1 || 1 || ½ || 1 || 9 || 54.75 || 2594
|-
| 3 || align="left" | || 2441 || 0 || ½ ||  || ½ || 1 || 0 || 1 || ½ || ½ || 1 || 1 || 1 || 1 || 1 || 9 || 50.50 || 2600
|-
| 4 || align="left" | || 2505 || ½ || ½ || ½ ||  || 1 || ½ || ½ || ½ || ½ || ½ || ½ || ½ || 1 || 1 || 8 ||  || 2541
|-
| 5 || align="left" | || 2543 || 0 || 0 || 0 || 0 ||  || 1 || 1 || 1 || 1 || 1 || ½ || 1 || 0 || 1 || 7½ ||  || 2508
|-
| 6 || align="left" | || 2485 || 0 || ½ || 1 || ½ || 0 ||  || ½ || ½ || 0 || 1 || 1 || 0 || 1 || ½ || 6½ || 39.75 || 2455
|-
| 7 || align="left" | || 2560 || ½ || ½ || 0 || ½ || 0 || ½ ||  || ½ || 1 || ½ || ½ || 1 || 1 || 0 || 6½ || 39.25 || 2450
|-
| 8 || align="left" | || 2466 || ½ || 0 || ½ || ½ || 0 || ½ || ½ ||  || 1 || 1 || ½ || 0 || ½ || 1 || 6½ || 38.75 || 2457
|-
| 9 || align="left" | || 2470 || 0 || 0 || ½ || ½ || 0 || 1 || 0 || 0 ||  || 1 || ½ || ½ || 1 || ½ || 5½ ||  || 2400
|-
| 10 || align="left" | || 2332 || 0 || 1 || 0 || ½ || 0 || 0 || ½ || 0 || 0 ||  || ½ || 1 || ½ || 1 || 5 || 28.75 || 2380
|-
| 11 || align="left" | || 2399 || 0 || 0 || 0 || ½ || ½ || 0 || ½ || ½ || ½ || ½ ||  || ½ || ½ || 1 || 5 || 27.25 || 2375
|- 
| 12 || align="left" | || 2473 || ½ || 0 || 0 || ½ || 0 || 1 || 0 || 1 || ½ || 0 || ½ ||  || 0 || ½ || 4½ ||  || 2346
|-
| 13 || align="left" | || 2230 || 0 || ½ || 0 || 0 || 1 || 0 || 0 || ½ || 0 || ½ || ½ || 1 ||  || 0 || 4 ||  || 2334
|-
| 14 || align="left" | || 2370 || 0 || 0 || 0 || 0 || 0 || ½ || 1 || 0 || ½ || 0 || 0 || ½ || 1 ||  || 3½ || || 2289
|}

2007 

{|class="wikitable" style="text-align:center;"
|+ 69th Corus Chess Tournament, grandmaster group A, 13–28 January 2007, Wijk aan Zee, Cat. XIX (2719)
|-
! !!Player !!Rating
!1 !!2 !!3 !!4 !!5 !!6 !!7 !!8 !!9 !!10 !!11 !!12 !!13 !!14 !! Total !! SB !! TPR
|-
|-style="background:#ccffcc;"
|1||align="left"| || 2744
| ||½||1||½||½||½||½||1||1||½||1||½||½||½||8½ || 54.25 || 2827
|-
|-style="background:#ccffcc;"
| 2 ||align="left"| || 2783
|½|| ||½||½||1||0||½||½||1||½||½||1||1||1||8½ || 51.50 ||2824
|-
|-style="background:#ccffcc;"
| 3 ||align="left"| || 2729
|0||½|| ||½||½||½||1||½||½||1||1||1||½||1||8½ || 50.00 ||2828
|-
| 4 ||align="left"| || 2766
|½||½||½|| ||1||½||½||½||½||½||½||1||½||1||8 ||  ||2802
|-
| 5 ||align="left"| || 2779
|½||0||½||0|| ||1||½||1||½||1||½||1||½||½||7½ ||  ||2771
|-
| 6 ||align="left"| || 2728
|½||1||½||½||0|| ||½||0||½||1||1||0||1||½||7 ||  ||2747
|-
| 7 ||align="left"| || 2719
|½||½||0||½||½||½|| ||0||1||½||½||1||1||0||6½ || 40.25 ||2719
|-
| 8 ||align="left"| || 2678
|0||½||½||½||0||1||1|| ||0||½||½||½||½||1||6½ || 40.25 ||2722
|-
| 9 ||align="left"| || 2723
|0||0||½||½||½||½||0||1|| ||½||½||½||1||½||6 ||  ||2690
|-
| 10 ||align="left"| || 2647
|½||½||0||½||0||0||½||½||½|| ||½||½||½||½||5 || 31.50 ||2638
|-
| 11 ||align="left"| || 2667
|0||½||0||½||½||0||½||½||½||½|| ||½||½||½||5 || 31.00 ||2635
|-
| 12 ||align="left"| ||  2683
|½||0||0||0||0||1||0||½||½||½||½|| ||½||1||5 || 29.25 ||2635
|-
| 13 ||align="left"| || 2690
|½||0||½||½||½||0||0||½||0||½||½||½|| ||½||4½ || 29.25 ||2611
|-
| 14 ||align="left"| || 2715 
|½||0||0||0||½||½||1||0||½||½||½||0||½|| ||4½ || 28.25 ||2609
|}

{| class="wikitable" style="text-align: center;"
|+ 69th Corus Chess Tournament, grandmaster group B, 13–28 January 2007, Wijk aan Zee, Cat. XIV (2600)
! !! Player !! Rating !! 1 !! 2 !! 3 !! 4 !! 5 !! 6 !! 7 !! 8 !! 9 !! 10 !! 11 !! 12 !! 13 !! 14 !! Total !! SB !! TPR
|-
| 1 || align=left| || 2675 ||  || 0 || 1 || ½ || 1 || 0 || ½ || ½ || 1 || ½ || 1 || 1 || 1 || 1 ||9 || || 2736
|-
| 2 || align=left| || 2658 || 1 ||  || ½ || 1 || ½ || ½ || 1 || 1 || 0 || ½ || ½ || 1 || 0 || ½ ||8 || 54.25 || 2683
|-
| 3 || align=left| || 2644 || 0 || ½ ||  || ½ || 1 || 1 || ½ || 1 || ½ || 1 || ½ || ½ || ½ || ½ ||8 || 51.00 || 2684
|-
| 4 || align=left| || 2691 || ½ || 0 || ½ ||  || 1 || 0 || ½ || ½ || 1 || 1 || ½ || 1 || ½ || 1 ||8 || 47.75 || 2680
|-
| 5 || align=left| || 2573 || 0 || ½ || 0 || 0 ||  || 1 || 1 || 1 || ½ || ½ || 1 || 1 || 1 || ½ ||8 || 46.25 || 2689
|-
| 6 || align=left| || 2594 || 1 || ½ || 0 || 1 || 0 ||  || ½ || ½ || 1 || ½ || ½ || 0 || 1 || 1 ||7½ || || 2658
|-
| 7 || align=left| || 2585 || ½ || 0 || ½ || ½ || 0 || ½ ||  || ½ || ½ || 1 || ½ || ½ || 1 || 1 ||7 || 40.75 || 2631
|-
| 8 || align=left| || 2658 || ½ || 0 || 0 || ½ || 0 || ½ || ½ ||  || 1 || 1 || ½ || 1 || ½ || 1 ||7 || 40.00 || 2625
|-
| 9 || align=left| || 2538 || 0 || 1 || ½ || 0 || ½ || 0 || ½ || 0 ||  || ½ || 1 || 1 || 1 || 0 ||6 || || 2576
|-
| 10 || align=left| || 2638 || ½ || ½ || 0 || 0 || ½ || ½ || 0 || 0 || ½ ||  || 1 || ½ || 1 || ½ ||5½ || || 2540
|-
| 11 || align=left| || 2586 || 0 || ½ || ½ || ½ || 0 || ½ || ½ || ½ || 0 || 0 ||  || ½ || 0 || 1 ||4½ || 29.00 || 2491
|-
| 12 || align=left| || 2566 || 0 || 0 || ½ || 0 || 0 || 1 || ½ || 0 || 0 || ½ || ½ ||  || 1 || ½ ||4½ || 26.00 || 2493
|-
| 13 || align=left| || 2474 || 0 || 1 || ½ || ½ || 0 || 0 || 0 || ½ || 0 || 0 || 1 || 0 ||  || ½ ||4 || 26.00 || 2469
|-
| 14 || align=left| || 2525 || 0 || ½ || ½ || 0 || ½ || 0 || 0 || 0 || 1 || ½ || 0 || ½ || ½ ||  ||4 || 25.00 || 2465
|}

{| class="wikitable" style="text-align: center;"
|+ 69th Corus Chess Tournament, grandmaster group C, 13–28 January 2007, Wijk aan Zee, Cat. X (2486)
! !! Player !! Rating !! 1 !! 2 !! 3 !! 4 !! 5 !! 6 !! 7 !! 8 !! 9 !! 10 !! 11 !! 12 !! 13 !! 14 !! Total !! SB !! TPR
|-
| 1 || align=left| || 2651 ||  || 0 || 1 || ½ || 1 || 1 || ½ || 1 || 1 || 1 || 1 || 1 || ½ || 1 ||10½ || || 2725
|-
| 2 || align=left| || 2587 || 1 ||  || ½ || ½ || ½ || ½ || 1 || 1 || 1 || 0 || 1 || 1 || 1 || 1 ||10 || || 2690
|-
| 3 || align=left| || 2586 || 0 || ½ ||  || 1 || ½ || 1 || ½ || 1 || 1 || 1 || ½ || 0 || ½ || ½ ||8 || || 2566
|-
| 4 || align=left| || 2538 || ½ || ½ || 0 ||  || 1 || 1 || 1 || 0 || ½ || 0 || ½ || 1 || ½ || 1 ||7½ || || 2539
|-
| 5 || align=left| || 2509 || 0 || ½ || ½ || 0 ||  || 1 || 1 || ½ || ½ || 1 || ½ || 1 || ½ || 0 ||7 || 42.75 || 2514
|-
| 6 || align=left| || 2414 || 0 || ½ || 0 || 0 || 0 ||  || ½ || 1 || ½ || 1 || 1 || 1 || ½ || 1 ||7 || 38.00 || 2521
|-
| 7 || align=left| || 2511 || ½ || 0 || ½ || 0 || 0 || ½ ||  || 1 || ½ || ½ || ½ || 1 || ½ || ½ ||6 || 35.50 || 2455
|-
| 8 || align=left| || 2375 || 0 || 0 || 0 || 1 || ½ || 0 || 0 ||  || 1 || 0 || 1 || ½ || 1 || 1 ||6 || 32.25 || 2466
|-
| 9 || align=left| || 2391 || 0 || 0 || 0 || ½ || ½ || ½ || ½ || 0 ||  || ½ || ½ || 1 || 1 || 1 ||6 || 31.25 || 2465
|-
| 10 || align=left| || 2496 || 0 || 1 || 0 || 1 || 0 || 0 || ½ || 1 || ½ ||  || ½ || 0 || 1 || 0 ||5½ || 36.25 || 2429
|-
| 11 || align=left| || 2431 || 0 || 0 || ½ || ½ || ½ || 0 || ½ || 0 || ½ || ½ ||  || 1 || ½ || 1 ||5½ || 30.00 || 2434
|-
| 12 || align=left| || 2425 || 0 || 0 || 1 || 0 || 0 || 0 || 0 || ½ || 0 || 1 || 0 ||  || 1 || 1 ||4½ || || 2381
|-
| 13 || align=left| || 2501 || ½ || 0 || ½ || ½ || ½ || ½ || ½ || 0 || 0 || 0 || ½ || 0 ||  || ½ ||4 || || 2344
|-
| 14 || align=left| || 2393 || 0 || 0 || ½ || 0 || 1 || 0 || ½ || 0 || 0 || 1 || 0 || 0 || ½ ||  ||3½ || || 2318
|}

2008 
The 2008 Corus Chess Tournament took place in the De Moriaan Community Centre in Wijk aan Zee. The format of each of the three Grandmaster groups remained a 14 player single round robin. The participants in group A included eight of the world's top ten players (country, October 2007 rating and rank in brackets): Viswanathan Anand (India, 2801, 1), Vasyl Ivanchuk (Ukraine, 2787, 2), Vladimir Kramnik (Russia, 2785, 3), Veselin Topalov (Bulgaria, 2769, 4), Peter Leko (Hungary, 2755, 5=), Shakhriyar Mamedyarov (Azerbaijan, 2752, 7), Teimour Radjabov (Azerbaijan, 2742, 8) and Levon Aronian (Armenia, 2741, 9). The remaining players were Boris Gelfand (Israel, 2736, 11), Michael Adams (England, 2729, 13), Magnus Carlsen (Norway, 2714, 16=), Judit Polgár (Hungary, 2708, 20), Pavel Eljanov (Ukraine, 2691, 26) and Loek van Wely (Netherlands, 2679, 31). The average rating of 2742 made it a Category 20 tournament. The only top ten players not participating were Alexander Morozevich (Russia, 2755, 5=) and Alexei Shirov (Spain, 2739, 10).

The tournament was won by Levon Aronian and Magnus Carlsen (both scoring 8 out of 13).

Grandmaster group B was won by Sergei Movsesian of Slovakia with 9½ points, and group C by Italy's Fabiano Caruana with 10, two points ahead of his nearest rival. The Honorary group, a new category consisting of four former A group champions playing a double round robin, was won by Ljubomir Ljubojević with 4 points out of 6, ahead of Jan Timman, Viktor Korchnoi and Lajos Portisch.

{| class="wikitable" style="text-align: center;"
|+ 70th Corus Chess Tournament, grandmaster group A, 12–27 January 2008, Wijk aan Zee, Cat. XX (2742)
! !! Player !! Rating !! 1 !! 2 !! 3 !! 4 !! 5 !! 6 !! 7 !! 8 !! 9 !! 10 !! 11 !! 12 !! 13 !! 14 !! Total !! SB !! TPR
|-
|-style="background:#ccffcc;"
| 1 || align=left| || 2739 ||  ||½ ||½ ||1 ||½ ||½ ||½ ||0 ||1 ||½ ||½ ||½ ||1 ||1 ||8 || 50.00 || 2830
|-
|-style="background:#ccffcc;"
| 2 || align=left| ||2733 ||½ || ||0 ||½ ||0 ||½ ||½ ||1 ||½ ||1 ||1 ||1 ||1 ||½ ||8 || 48.50 || 2830
|-
| 3 || align=left| ||2799 ||½ ||1 || ||0 ||½ ||½ ||½ ||½ ||1 ||1 ||½ ||½ ||½ ||½ ||7½ || 48.00 || 2795
|-
| 4 || align=left| ||2735 ||0 ||½ ||1 || ||½ ||½ ||½ ||½ ||½ ||½ ||½ ||1 ||½ ||1 ||7½ || 46.50 || 2800
|-
| 5 || align=left| ||2753 ||½ ||1 ||½ ||½ || ||½ ||½ ||½ ||0 ||½ ||1 ||½ ||½ ||½ ||7 || 46.00 || 2770
|-
| 6 || align=left| ||2751 ||½ ||½ ||½ ||½ ||½ || ||½ ||½ ||½ ||½ ||½ ||1 ||½ ||½ ||7 || 44.50 || 2771
|-
| 7 || align=left| ||2726 ||½ ||½ ||½ ||½ ||½ ||½ || ||½ ||½ ||0 ||½ ||½ ||1 ||½ ||6½ || 41.75 || 2744
|-
| 8 || align=left| ||2799 ||1 ||0 ||½ ||½ ||½ ||½ ||½ || ||0 ||½ ||½ ||1 ||½ ||½ ||6½ || 41.75 || 2738
|-
| 9 || align=left| ||2780 ||0 ||½ ||0 ||½ ||1 ||½ ||½ ||1 || ||½ ||½ ||0 ||0 ||1 ||6 || 39.00 || 2710
|-
| 10 || align=left| ||2707 ||½ ||0 ||0 ||½ ||½ ||½ ||1 ||½ ||½ || ||½ ||0 ||½ ||1 ||6 || 38.00 || 2716
|-
| 11 || align=left| ||2760 ||½ ||0 ||½ ||½ ||0 ||½ ||½ ||½ ||½ ||½ || ||½ ||1 ||½ ||6 || 37.50 || 2712
|-
| 12 || align=left| ||2692 ||½ ||0 ||½ ||0 ||½ ||0 ||½ ||0 ||1 ||1 ||½ || ||½ ||0 ||5 || 32.00 || 2659
|-
| 13 || align=left| ||2681 ||0 ||0 ||½ ||½ ||½ ||½ ||0 ||½ ||1 ||½ ||0 ||½ || ||½ ||5 || 31.75 || 2660
|-
| 14 || align=left| ||2737 ||0 ||½ ||½ ||0 ||½ ||½ ||½ ||½ ||0 ||0 ||½ ||1 ||½ || ||5 || 31.75 || 2656
|}

{| class="wikitable" style="text-align: center;"
|+ 70th Corus Chess Tournament, grandmaster group B, 12–27 January 2008, Wijk aan Zee, Cat. XV (2618)
! !! Player !! Rating !! 1 !! 2 !! 3 !! 4 !! 5 !! 6 !! 7 !! 8 !! 9 !! 10 !! 11 !! 12 !! 13 !! 14 !! Total !! SB !! TPR
|-
| 1 || align=left| || 2677 ||  || ½ || ½ || ½ || ½ || ½ || 1 || 1 || 1 || 1 || ½ || ½ || 1 || 1 ||9½ || || 2789
|-
| 2 || align=left| || 2645 || ½ ||  || ½ || ½ || ½ || 1 || 1 || 1 || 0 || ½ || ½ || 1 || 1 || ½ ||8½ || 52.50 || 2726
|-
| 3 || align=left| || 2700 || ½ || ½ ||  || ½ || ½ || ½ || ½ || 1 || 1 || ½ || ½ || ½ || 1 || 1 ||8½ || 51.75 || 2722
|-
| 4 || align=left| || 2664 || ½ || ½ || ½ ||  || ½ || 1 || ½ || 0 || 1 || ½ || ½ || ½ || ½ || 1 ||7½ || || 2672
|-
| 5 || align=left| || 2600 || ½ || ½ || ½ || ½ ||  || 0 || ½ || 0 || ½ || 1 || ½ || 1 || ½ || 1 ||7 || || 2648
|-
| 6 || align=left| || 2713 || ½ || 0 || ½ || 0 || 1 ||  || 0 || 0 || ½ || 1 || ½ || ½ || 1 || 1 ||6½ || || 2611
|-
| 7 || align=left| || 2581 || 0 || 0 || ½ || ½ || ½ || 1 ||  || ½ || 1 || ½ || 1 || ½ || 0 || 0 ||6 || 38.00 || 2592
|-
| 8 || align=left| || 2573 || 0 || 0 || 0 || 1 || 1 || 1 || ½ ||  || 0 || ½ || 1 || ½ || ½ || 0 ||6 || 37.50 || 2593
|-
| 9 || align=left| || 2527 || 0 || 1 || 0 || 0 || ½ || ½ || 0 || 1 ||  || ½ || ½ || 1 || ½ || ½ ||6 || 36.50 || 2596
|-
| 10 || align=left| || 2625 || 0 || ½ || ½ || ½ || 0 || 0 || ½ || ½ || ½ ||  || ½ || ½ || 1 || 1 ||6 || 35.50 || 2589
|-
| 11 || align=left| || 2612 || ½ || ½ || ½ || ½ || ½ || ½ || 0 || 0 || ½ || ½ ||  || ½ || 1 || 0 ||5½ || || 2562
|-
| 12 || align=left| || 2676 || ½ || 0 || ½ || ½ || 0 || ½ || ½ || ½ || 0 || ½ || ½ ||  || 0 || 1 ||5 || 31.75 || 2527
|-
| 13 || align=left| || 2636 || 0 || 0 || 0 || ½ || ½ || 0 || 1 || ½ || ½ || 0 || 0 || 1 ||  || 1 ||5 || 28.25 || 2530
|-
| 14 || align=left| || 2424 || 0 || ½ || 0 || 0 || 0 || 0 || 1 || 1 || ½ || 0 || 1 || 0 || 0 ||  ||4 || || 2492
|}

{| class="wikitable" style="text-align: center;"
|+ 70th Corus Chess Tournament, grandmaster group C, 12–27 January 2008, Wijk aan Zee, Cat. X (2494)
! !! Player !! Rating !! 1 !! 2 !! 3 !! 4 !! 5 !! 6 !! 7 !! 8 !! 9 !! 10 !! 11 !! 12 !! 13 !! 14 !! Total !! SB !! TPR
|-
| 1 || align=left| || 2598 ||  || ½ || 1 || 1 || 0 || 1 || 1 || 1 || 1 || 0 || ½ || 1 || 1 || 1 ||10 || || 2696
|-
| 2 || align=left| || 2533 || ½ ||  || ½ || 1 || ½ || ½ || ½ || 0 || ½ || 1 || ½ || ½ || 1 || 1 ||8 || 48.00 || 2577
|-
| 3 || align=left| || 2526 || 0 || ½ ||  || 0 || 1 || 0 || 1 || 0 || ½ || 1 || 1 || 1 || 1 || 1 ||8 || 44.25 || 2578
|-
| 4 || align=left| || 2501 || 0 || 0 || 1 ||  || 0 || 1 || ½ || 1 || ½ || ½ || ½ || ½ || 1 || 1 ||7½ || || 2550
|-
| 5 || align=left| || 2473 || 1 || ½ || 0 || 1 ||  || 1 || 1 || 0 || ½ || 0 || 0 || ½ || ½ || 1 ||7 || 45.25 || 2524
|-
| 6 || align=left| || 2536 || 0 || ½ || 1 || 0 || 0 ||  || ½ || 1 || 1 || ½ || 0 || 1 || 1 || ½ ||7 || 42.00 || 2519
|-
| 7 || align=left| || 2490 || 0 || ½ || 0 || ½ || 0 || ½ ||  || 1 || ½ || 1 || 1 || ½ || 1 || ½ ||7 || 41.25 || 2523
|-
| 8 || align=left| || 2578 || 0 || 1 || 1 || 0 || 1 || 0 || 0 ||  || 0 || 1 || ½ || ½ || 1 || 1 ||7 || 40.75 || 2516
|-
| 9 || align=left| || 2389 || 0 || ½ || ½ || ½ || ½ || 0 || ½ || 1 ||  || 1 || 1 || ½ || 0 || ½ ||6½ || || 2502
|-
| 10 || align=left| || 2502 || 1 || 0 || 0 || ½ || 1 || ½ || 0 || 0 || 0 ||  || 1 || ½ || 1 || ½ ||6 || 38.00 || 2464
|-
| 11 || align=left| || 2509 || ½ || ½ || 0 || ½ || 1 || 1 || 0 || ½ || 0 || 0 ||  || 1 || 0 || 1 ||6 || 36.75 || 2463
|-
| 12 || align=left| || 2461 || 0 || ½ || 0 || ½ || ½ || 0 || ½ || ½ || ½ || ½ || 0 ||  || 0 || 1 ||4½ || 26.50 || 2386
|-
| 13 || align=left| || 2484 || 0 || 0 || 0 || 0 || ½ || 0 || 0 || 0 || 1 || 0 || 1 || 1 ||  || 1 ||4½ || 22.50 || 2384
|-
| 14 || align=left| || 2329 || 0 || 0 || 0 || 0 || 0 || ½ || ½ || 0 || ½ || ½ || 0 || 0 || 0 ||  ||2 || || 2210
|}

{| class="wikitable" style="text-align: center;"
|+ 70th Corus Chess, honorary group, 12–27 January 2008, Wijk aan Zee, Cat. XIII (2560)
! !! Player !! Rating !! 1 !! 2 !! 3 !! 4 !! Total !! SB !! TPR
|-
| 1 || align=left| || 2565 ||  || 0 1 || ½ 1 || ½ 1  || 4 || || 2683
|-
| 2 || align=left| || 2559 || 1 0 ||  || ½ 1 || ½ 0 || 3 || 9.50 || 2560
|-
| 3 || align=left| || 2545 || ½ 0 || ½ 0 ||  || 1 1 || 3 || 7.50 || 2565
|-
| 4 || align=left| || 2570 || ½ 0 || ½ 1 || 0 0 ||  || 2 || || 2431
|}

2009 
{| class="wikitable" style="text-align: center;"
|+ 71st Corus Chess Tournament, grandmaster group A, 17 January – 1 February 2009, Wijk aan Zee, Cat. XIX (2716)
! !! Player !! Rating !! 1 !! 2 !! 3 !! 4 !! 5 !! 6 !! 7 !! 8 !! 9 !! 10 !! 11 !! 12 !! 13 !! 14 !! Total !! SB !! TPR
|-
|-style="background:#ccffcc;"
| 1 || align=left| || 2706 ||  ||½ ||½ ||1 ||½ ||1 ||0 ||½ ||½ ||½ ||0 ||1 ||1 ||1 ||8 || || 2804
|-
| 2 || align=left| ||2750 ||½ || ||½ ||1 ||½ ||0 ||1 ||½ ||½ ||½ ||½ ||½ ||1 ||½ ||7½ || 48.00 || 2770
|-
| 3 || align=left| ||2761 ||½ ||½ || ||½ ||½ ||½ ||1 ||0 ||1 ||½ ||1 ||½ ||½ ||½ ||7½ || 47.75 || 2770
|-
| 4 || align=left| ||2751 ||0 ||0 ||½ || ||½ ||½ ||½ ||1 ||½ ||½ ||1 ||½ ||1 ||1 ||7½ || 45.25 || 2770
|-
| 5 || align=left| ||2776 ||½ ||½ ||½ ||½ || ||1 ||½ ||½ ||0 ||1||½ ||½ ||½ ||½ ||7 || 45.50 || 2740
|-
| 6 || align=left| ||2717 ||0 ||1 ||½ ||½ ||0 || ||½ ||½ ||½ ||½ ||½ ||1 ||½ ||1 ||7 || 43.75 || 2745
|-
| 7 || align=left| ||2725 ||1 ||0 ||0 ||½ ||½ ||½ || ||½ ||½ ||½ ||½ ||½ ||½ ||1 ||6½ || || 2715
|-
| 8 || align=left| ||2625 ||½ ||½ ||1 ||0 ||½ ||½ ||½ || ||½ ||½ ||½ ||½ ||½ ||0 ||6 || 39.75 || 2694
|-
| 9 || align=left| ||2739 ||½ ||½ ||0 ||½ ||1 ||½ ||½ ||½ || ||½ ||0 ||½ ||0 ||1 ||6 || 39.50 || 2685
|-
| 10 || align=left| ||2601 ||½ ||½ ||½ ||½ ||0 ||½ ||½ ||½ ||½ || ||1 ||½ ||½ ||0 ||6 || 39.00 || 2696
|-
| 11 || align=left| ||2779 ||1 ||½ ||0 ||0 ||½ ||½ ||½ ||½ ||1 ||0 || ||½ ||½ ||0 ||5½ || 36.50 || 2654
|-
| 12 || align=left| ||2612 ||0 ||½ ||½ ||½ ||½ ||0 ||½ ||½ ||½ ||½ ||½ || ||½ ||½ ||5½ || 35.25 || 2667
|-
| 13 || align=left| ||2712 ||0 ||0 ||½ ||0 ||½ ||½ ||½ ||½ ||1 ||½ ||½ ||½ || ||½ ||5½ || 34.25 || 2659
|-
| 14 || align=left| ||2771 ||0 ||½ ||½ ||0 ||½ ||0 ||0 ||1 ||0 ||1 ||1 ||½ ||½ || ||5½ || 34.00 || 2655
|}

{| class="wikitable" style="text-align: center;"
|+ 71st Corus Chess Tournament, grandmaster group B, 17 January – 1 February 2009, Wijk aan Zee, Cat. XVI (2641)
! !! Player !! Rating !! 1 !! 2 !! 3 !! 4 !! 5 !! 6 !! 7 !! 8 !! 9 !! 10 !! 11 !! 12 !! 13 !! 14 !! Total !! SB !! TPR
|-
| 1 || align=left| || 2646 ||  || 1 || ½ || ½ || ½ || 0 || 0 || 1 || ½ || ½ || 1 || 1 || 1 || 1 ||8½ || || 2751
|-
| 2 || align=left| || 2663 || 0 ||  || ½ || 1 || ½ || 1 || ½ || 1 || 1 || ½ || 1 || ½ || ½ || 0 ||8 || 52.00 || 2727
|-
| 3 || align=left| || 2676 || ½ || ½ ||  || 1 || ½ || ½ || ½ || 0 || ½ || 1 || 1 || ½ || 1 || ½ ||8 || 50.00 || 2726 
|-
| 4 || align=left| || 2687 || ½ || 0 || 0 ||  || ½ || 1 || ½ || ½ || ½ || 1 || 1 || 1 || ½ || 1 ||8 || 47.25 || 2725 
|-
| 5 || align=left| || 2671 || ½ || ½ || ½ || ½ ||  || ½ || 0 || 1 || 1 || 1 || ½ || ½ || ½ || ½ ||7½ || 47.50 || 2696
|-
| 6 || align=left| || 2702 || 1 || 0 || ½ || 0 || ½ ||  || ½ || 0 || 1 || 0 || 1 || 1 || 1 || 1 ||7½ || 43.75 || 2694
|-
| 7 || align=left| || 2688 || 1 || ½ || ½ || ½ || 1 || ½ ||  || 0 || 0 || ½ || 0 || 1 || ½ || 1 ||7 || || 2667
|-
| 8 || align=left| || 2638 || 0 || 0 || 1 || ½ || 0 || 1 || 1 ||  || ½ || ½ || 0 || ½ || ½ || 1 ||6½ || || 2642
|-
| 9 || align=left| || 2549 || ½ || 0 || ½ || ½ || 0 || 0 || 1 || ½ ||  || 1 || ½ || ½ || ½ || ½ ||6 || 37.50 || 2619
|-
| 10 || align=left| || 2571 || ½ || ½ || 0 || 0 || 0 || 1 || ½ || ½ || 0 ||  || ½ || 1 || ½ || 1 ||6 || 35.75 || 2618
|-
| 11 || align=left| || 2603 || 0 || 0 || 0 || 0 || ½ || 0 || 1 || 1 || ½ || ½ ||  || ½ || 1 || ½ ||5½ || || 2587
|-
| 12 || align=left| || 2567 || 0 || ½ || ½ || 0 || ½ || 0 || 0 || ½ || ½ || 0 || ½ ||  || ½ || 1 ||4½ || || 2537
|-
| 13 || align=left| || 2607 || 0 || ½ || 0 || ½ || ½ || 0 || ½ || ½ || ½ || ½ || 0 || ½ ||  || 0 ||4 || 26.75 || 2503
|-
| 14 || align=left| || 2711 || 0 || 1 || ½ || 0 || ½ || 0 || 0 || 0 || ½ || 0 || ½ || 0 || 1 ||  ||4 || 25.50 || 2495
|}

{| class="wikitable" style="text-align: center;"
|+ 71st Corus Chess Tournament, grandmaster group C, 17 January – 1 February 2009, Wijk aan Zee, Cat. XI (2521)
! !! Player !! Rating !! 1 !! 2 !! 3 !! 4 !! 5 !! 6 !! 7 !! 8 !! 9 !! 10 !! 11 !! 12 !! 13 !! 14 !! Total !! SB !! TPR
|-
| 1 || align=left| || 2627 ||  || 1 || ½ || ½ || ½ || 0 || ½ || 1 || 1 || 1 || 1 || 1 || 1 || ½ ||9½ || || 2688
|-
| 2 || align=left| || 2586 || 0 ||  || 1 || 0 || 1 || 1 || ½ || 0 || ½ || 1 || ½ || 1 || 1 || 1 ||8½ || 51.50 || 2626
|-
| 3 || align=left| || 2469 || ½ || 0 ||  || 1 || ½ || ½ || ½ || ½ || ½ || ½ || 1 || 1 || 1 || 1 ||8½ || 51.00 || 2635
|-
| 4 || align=left| || 2569 || ½ || 1 || 0 ||  || 1 || 1 || 0 || 0 || 0 || 1 || 0 || 1 || 1 || 1 ||7½ || 47.75 || 2574
|-
| 5 || align=left| || 2622 || ½ || 0 || ½ || 0 ||  || ½ || 0 || 1 || 1 || 0 || 1 || 1 || 1 || 1 ||7½ || 43.75 || 2570
|-
| 6 || align=left| || 2524 || 1 || 0 || ½ || 0 || ½ ||  || ½ || ½ || 0 || 1 || 1 || 0 || 1 || ½ ||6½ || || 2521
|-
| 7 || align=left| || 2473 || ½ || ½ || ½ || 1 || 1 || ½ ||  || ½ || 0 || ½ || ½ || ½ || 0 || 0 ||6 || || 2496
|-
| 8 || align=left| || 2400 || 0 || 1 || ½ || 1 || 0 || ½ || ½ ||  || 1 || 0 || 0 || 1 || 0 || 0 ||5½ || 37.50 || 2473
|-
| 9 || align=left| || 2560 || 0 || ½ || ½ || 1 || 0 || 1 || 1 || 0 ||  || 0 || 1 || 0 || 0 || ½ ||5½ || 36.25 || 2461
|-
| 10 || align=left| || 2418 || 0 || 0 || ½ || 0 || 1 || 0 || ½ || 1 || 1 ||  || 0 || 1 || 0 || ½ ||5½ || 33.50 || 2472
|-
| 11 || align=left| || 2444 || 0 || ½ || 0 || 1 || 0 || 0 || ½ || 1 || 0 || 1 ||  || 0 || 1 || ½ ||5½ || 33.00 || 2470
|-
| 12 || align=left| || 2528 || 0 || 0 || 0 || 0 || 0 || 1 || ½ || 0 || 1 || 0 || 1 ||  || 1 || 1 ||5½ || 30.00 || 2464
|-
| 13 || align=left| || 2542 || 0 || 0 || 0 || 0 || 0 || 0 || 1 || 1 || 1 || 1 || 0 || 0 ||  || 1 ||5 || || 2432
|-
| 14 || align=left| || 2533 || ½ || 0 || 0 || 0 || 0 || ½ || 1 || 1 || ½ || ½ || ½ || 0 || 0 ||  ||4½ || || 2410
|}

2010s

2010
{| class="wikitable" style="text-align: center;"
|+ 72nd Corus Chess Tournament, grandmaster group A, 16–31 January 2010, Wijk aan Zee, Cat. XIX (2719)
! !! Player !! Rating !! 1 !! 2 !! 3 !! 4 !! 5 !! 6 !! 7 !! 8 !! 9 !! 10 !! 11 !! 12 !! 13 !! 14 !! Total !! SB !! TPR
|-
|-style="background:#ccffcc;"
| 1 || align=left| || 2810 ||  ||0 ||½ ||½ ||½ ||1 ||1 ||½ ||1 ||½ ||½ ||1 ||½ ||1 ||8½ || || 2822
|-
| 2 || align=left| ||2788 ||1 || ||½ ||0 ||1 ||½ ||½ ||½ ||½ ||½ ||½ ||1 ||½ ||1 ||8 || 50.50 || 2801
|-
| 3 || align=left| ||2723 ||½ ||½ || ||0 ||0 ||½ ||½ ||1 ||½ ||1 ||½ ||1 ||1 ||1 ||8 || 47.00 || 2806
|-
| 4 || align=left| ||2790 ||½ ||1 ||1 || ||½ ||½ ||½ ||½ ||½ ||½ ||½ ||½ ||½ ||½ ||7½ || 49.75 || 2771
|-
| 5 || align=left| ||2708 ||½ ||0 ||1 ||½ || ||0 ||½ ||½ ||½ ||½||1 ||1 ||1 ||½ ||7½ || 45.50 || 2777
|-
| 6 || align=left| ||2720 ||0 ||½ ||½ ||½ ||1 || ||½ ||½ ||½ ||½ ||1 ||½ ||½ ||½ ||7 || 44.00 || 2748
|-
| 7 || align=left| ||2749 ||0 ||½ ||½ ||½ ||½ ||½ || ||½ ||½ ||½ ||½ ||1 ||½ ||1 ||7 || 42.50 || 2746
|-
| 8 || align=left| ||2739 ||½ ||½ ||0 ||½ ||½ ||½ ||½ || ||½ ||1 ||½ ||0 ||½ ||1 ||6½ || 40.75 || 2718
|-
| 9 || align=left| ||2712 ||0 ||½ ||½ ||½ ||½ ||½ ||½ ||½ || ||½ ||½ ||½ ||1 ||½ ||6½ || 40.25 || 2720
|-
| 10 || align=left| ||2675 ||½ ||½ ||0 ||½ ||½ ||½ ||½ ||0 ||½ || ||½ ||½ ||1 ||0 ||5½ || || 2666
|-
| 11 || align=left| ||2696 ||½ ||½ ||½ ||½ ||0 ||0 ||½ ||½ ||½ ||½ || ||0 ||½ ||½ ||5 || 33.25 || 2634
|-
| 12 || align=left| ||2641 ||0 ||0 ||0 ||½ ||0 ||½ ||0 ||1 ||½ ||½ ||1 || ||1 ||0 ||5 || 29.25 || 2638
|-
| 13 || align=left| ||2662 ||½ ||½ ||0 ||½ ||0 ||½ ||½ ||½ ||0 ||0 ||½ ||0 || ||1 ||4½ || 29.25 || 2614
|-
| 14 || align=left| ||2657 ||0 ||0 ||0 ||½ ||½ ||½ ||0 ||0 ||½ ||1 ||½ ||1 ||0 || ||4½ || 27.25 || 2614
|}

{| class="wikitable" style="text-align: center;"
|+ 72nd Corus Chess Tournament, grandmaster group B, 16–31 January 2010, Wijk aan Zee, Cat. XVI (2629)
! !! Player !! Rating !! 1 !! 2 !! 3 !! 4 !! 5 !! 6 !! 7 !! 8 !! 9 !! 10 !! 11 !! 12 !! 13 !! 14 !! Total !! SB !! TPR
|-
| 1 || align=left| || 2588 ||  || ½ || ½ || ½ || 1 || 1 || ½ || 1 || 1 || 0 || 1 || ½ || 1 || ½ ||9 || || 2773
|-
| 2 || align=left| || 2687 || ½ ||  || ½ || 1 || ½ || 0 || ½ || ½ || ½ || 1 || 1 || ½ || 1 || 1 ||8½ || || 2735
|-
| 3 || align=left| || 2657 || ½ || ½ ||   || ½ || ½ || ½ || ½ || 0 || 1 || 1 || ½ || ½ || 1 || 1 ||8 || || 2714
|-
| 4 || align=left| || 2615 || ½ || 0 || ½ ||  || ½ || ½ || 1 || 1 || ½ || ½ || ½ || ½ || ½ || 1 ||7½ || 46.00 || 2687
|-
| 5 || align=left| || 2656 || 0 || ½ || ½ || ½ ||  || ½ || ½ || ½ || ½ || ½ || 1 || 1 || 1 || ½ ||7½ || 45.00 || 2684 
|-
| 6 || align=left| || 2672 || 0 || 1 || ½ || ½ || ½ ||  || ½ || ½ || ½ || 1 || ½ || 0 || ½ || ½ ||6½ || 42.25 || 2626
|-
| 7 || align=left| || 2621 || ½ || ½ || ½ || 0 || ½ || ½ ||  || ½ || ½ || ½ || ½ || 1 || 0 || 1 ||6½ || 40.75 || 2630
|-
| 8 || align=left| || 2606 || 0 || ½ || 1 || 0 || ½ || ½ || ½ ||  || 0 || ½ || ½ || 1 || 1 || 0 ||6 || 38.00 || 2602
|-
| 9 || align=left| || 2657 || 0 || ½ || 0 || ½ || ½ || ½ || ½ || 1 ||  || ½ || ½ || 1 || 0 || ½ ||6 || 37.00 || 2598
|-
| 10 || align=left| || 2523 || 1 || 0 || 0 || ½ || ½ || 0 || ½ || ½ || ½ ||  || ½ || ½ || ½ || ½ ||5½ || 35.75 || 2580
|-
| 11 || align=left| || 2681 || 0 || 0 || ½ || ½ || 0 || ½ || ½ || ½ || ½ || ½ ||  || ½ || 1 || ½ ||5½ || 32.75 || 2568
|-
| 12 || align=left| || 2573 || ½ || ½ || ½ || ½ || 0 || 1 || 0 || 0 || 0 || ½ || ½ ||  || 0 || 1 ||5 || 33.00 || 2546
|-
| 13 || align=left| || 2643 || 0 || 0 || 0 || ½ || 0 || ½ || 1 || 0 || 1 || ½ || 0 || 1 ||  || ½ ||5 || 29.50 || 2541
|-
| 14 || align=left| || 2628 || ½ || 0 || 0 || 0 || ½ || ½ || 0 || 1 || ½ || ½ || ½ || 0 || ½ ||  ||4½ || || 2519
|}

{| class="wikitable" style="text-align: center;"
|+ 72nd Corus Chess Tournament, grandmaster group C, 16–31 January 2010, Wijk aan Zee, Cat. IX (2455)
! !! Player !! Rating !! 1 !! 2 !! 3 !! 4 !! 5 !! 6 !! 7 !! 8 !! 9 !! 10 !! 11 !! 12 !! 13 !! 14 !! Total !! SB !! TPR
|-
| 1 || align=left| || 2604 ||  || ½ || ½ || ½ || 1 || 1 || 1 || 0 || ½ || 1 || 1 || 1 || 1 || 1 ||10 || || 2655
|-
| 2 || align=left| || 2577 || ½ ||  || 0 || 1 || ½ || 1 || ½ || 1 || 1 || ½ || 0 || ½ || 1 || 1 ||8½ || || 2556
|-
| 3 || align=left| || 2456 || ½ || 1 ||  || 0 || 1 || 1 || ½ || 0 || 1 || 0 || ½ || ½ || 1 || 1 ||8 || 49.25 || 2542
|-
| 4 || align=left| || 2495 || ½ || 0 || 1 ||  || ½ || 1 || 0 || 1 || 0 || 1 || 0 || 1 || 1 || 1 ||8 || 47.25 || 2539
|-
| 5 || align=left| || 2495 || 0 || ½ || 0 || ½ ||  || 0 || 1 || 1 || ½ || 1 || ½ || ½ || 1 || 1 ||7½ || 41.50 || 2509
|-
| 6 || align=left| || 2570 || 0 || 0 || 0 || 0 || 1 ||  || 1 || ½ || 1 || ½ || 1 || 1 || ½ || 1 ||7½ || 41.50 || 2503
|-
| 7 || align=left| || 2322 || 0 || ½ || ½ || 1 || 0 || 0 ||  || 1 || 1 || ½ || 0 || 1 || ½ || 1 ||7 || || 2494
|-
| 8 || align=left| || 2515 || 1 || 0 || 1 || 0 || 0 || ½ || 0 ||  || 0 || 1 || 1 || ½ || 1 || 0 ||6 || 38.75 || 2422
|-
| 9 || align=left| || 2340 || ½ || 0 || 0 || 1 || ½ || 0 || 0 || 1 ||  || 1 || ½ || 0 || 1 || ½ ||6 || 36.00 || 2435
|-
| 10 || align=left| || 2447 || 0 || ½ || 1 || 0 || 0 || ½ || ½ || 0 || 0 ||  || 1 || ½ || 1 || 1 ||6 || 33.50 || 2427
|-
| 11 || align=left| || 2547 || 0 || 1 || ½ || 1 || ½ || 0 || 1 || 0 || ½ || 0 ||  || 0 || ½ || ½ ||5½ || || 2391
|-
| 12 || align=left| || 2402 || 0 || ½ || ½ || 0 || ½ || 0 || 0 || ½ || 1 || ½ || 1 ||  || 0 || ½ ||5 || || 2372
|-
| 13 || align=left| || 2279 || 0 || 0 || 0 || 0 || 0 || ½ || ½ || 0 || 0 || 0 || ½ || 1 ||  || ½ ||3 || 16.50 || 2258
|-
| 14 || align=left| || 2323 || 0 || 0 || 0 || 0 || 0 || 0 || 0 || 1 || ½ || 0 || ½ || ½ || ½ ||  ||3 || 15.75 || 2254
|}

2011
{| class="wikitable" style="text-align: center;"
|+ 73rd Tata Steel Chess, grandmaster group A, 15–30 January 2011, Wijk aan Zee, Cat. XX (2740)
! !! Player !! Rating !! 1 !! 2 !! 3 !! 4 !! 5 !! 6 !! 7 !! 8 !! 9 !! 10 !! 11 !! 12 !! 13 !! 14 !! Total !! SB !! TPR
|-
|-style="background:#ccffcc;"
| 1 || align=left| || 2751 ||  ||½ ||0 ||½ ||½ ||1 ||½ ||½ ||1 ||½ ||1 ||1 ||1 ||1 ||9 || || 2880
|-
| 2 || align=left| ||2814 ||½ || ||½ ||½ ||½ ||½ ||½ ||1 ||½ ||1 ||½ ||½ ||1 ||1 ||8½ || || 2844
|-
| 3 || align=left| ||2814 ||1 ||½ || ||½ ||1 ||½ ||0 ||½ ||0 ||1 ||½ ||1 ||1 ||½ ||8 || 51.00 || 2821
|-
| 4 || align=left| ||2805 ||½ ||½ ||½ || ||½ ||½ ||½ ||½ ||1 ||½ ||1 ||½ ||½ ||1 ||8 || 48.75 || 2822
|-
| 5 || align=left| ||2784 ||½ ||½ ||0 ||½ || ||½ ||1 ||½ ||½ ||½||½ ||1 ||½ ||1 ||7½ || 45.25 || 2793
|-
| 6 || align=left| ||2715 ||0 ||½ ||½ ||½ ||½ || ||½ ||½ ||1 ||½ ||½ ||½ ||1 ||1 ||7½ || 44.50 || 2799
|-
| 7 || align=left| ||2686 ||½ ||½ ||1 ||½ ||0 ||½ || ||½ ||0 ||1 ||½ ||½ ||½ ||½ ||6½ || 42.50 || 2744
|-
| 8 || align=left| ||2744 ||½ ||0 ||½ ||½ ||½ ||½ ||½ || ||½ ||0 ||1 ||½ ||1 ||½ ||6½ || 39.50 || 2740
|-
| 9 || align=left| ||2733 ||0 ||½ ||1 ||0 ||½ ||0 ||1 ||½ || ||1 ||½ ||0 ||½ ||½ ||6 || 38.25 || 2711
|-
| 10 || align=left| ||2731 ||½ ||0 ||0 ||½ ||½ ||½ ||0 ||1 ||0 || ||1 ||1 ||½ ||½ ||6 || 35.75 || 2712
|-
| 11 || align=left| ||2773 ||0 ||½ ||½ ||0 ||½ ||½ ||½ ||0 ||½ ||0 || ||½ ||1 ||0 ||4½ || 28.75 || 2627
|-
| 12 || align=left| ||2628 ||0 ||½ ||0 ||½ ||0 ||½ ||½ ||½ ||½ ||0 ||½ || ||½ ||½ ||4½ || 28.00 || 2638
|-
| 13 || align=left| ||2662 ||0 ||0 ||0 ||½ ||½ ||0 ||½ ||0 ||1 ||½ ||0 ||½ || ||1 ||4½ || 26.25 || 2636
|-
| 14 || align=left| ||2722 ||0 ||0 ||½ ||0 ||0 ||0 ||½ ||½ ||½ ||½ ||1 ||½ ||0 || ||4 || || 2600
|}

{| class="wikitable" style="text-align: center;"
|+ 73rd Tata Steel Chess, grandmaster group B, 15–30 January 2011, Wijk aan Zee, Cat. XVII (2659)
! !! Player !! Rating !! 1 !! 2 !! 3 !! 4 !! 5 !! 6 !! 7 !! 8 !! 9 !! 10 !! 11 !! 12 !! 13 !! 14 !! Total !! SB !! TPR
|-
| 1 || align=left| || 2664 ||  || ½ || 0 || 0 || 1 || ½ || 1 || 1 || 1 || ½ || 1 || 1 || ½ || ½ ||8½ || 52.25 || 2768
|-
| 2 || align=left| || 2708 || ½ ||  || 0 || ½ || 0 || ½ || 1 || 1 || 1 || ½ || 1 || 1 || ½ || 1 ||8½ || 50.25 || 2765
|-
| 3 || align=left| || 2701 || 1 || 1 ||  || ½ || ½ || ½ || 0 || ½ || ½ || ½ || ½ || 1 || 1 || ½ ||8 || || 2743
|-
| 4 || align=left| || 2664 || 1 || ½ || ½ ||  || ½ || 1 || ½ || 0 || 0 || 1 || ½ || 0 || 1 || 1 ||7½ || 47.75 || 2715
|-
| 5 || align=left| || 2673 || 0 || 1 || ½ || ½ ||  || ½ || ½ || ½ || 0 || 1 || 1 || 1 || ½ || ½ ||7½ || 47.00 || 2715
|-
| 6 || align=left| || 2667 || ½ || ½ || ½ || 0 || ½ ||  || ½ || 1 || ½ || ½ || 1 || ½ || ½ || 1 ||7½ || 45.75 || 2715
|-
| 7 || align=left| || 2636 || 0 || 0 || 1 || ½ || ½ || ½ ||  || ½ || 0 || ½ || 1 || 1 || 1 || ½ ||7 || || 2690
|-
| 8 || align=left| || 2726 || 0 || 0 || ½ || 1 || ½ || 0 || ½ ||  || 1 || 1 || 0 || ½ || ½ || 1 ||6½ || || 2654
|-
| 9 || align=left| || 2649 || 0 || 0 || ½ || 1 || 1 || ½ || 1 || 0 ||  || 0 || ½ || 0 || 1 || ½ ||6 || 38.25 || 2631
|-
| 10 || align=left| || 2707 || ½ || ½ || ½ || 0 || 0 || ½ || ½ || 0 || 1 ||  || 1 || 0 || 1 || ½ ||6 || 37.00 || 2626
|-
| 11 || align=left| || 2651 || 0 || 0 || ½ || ½ || 0 || 0 || 0 || 1 || ½ || 0 ||  || 1 || 1 || 1 ||5½ || || 2602
|-
| 12 || align=left| || 2547 || 0 || 0 || 0 || 1 || 0 || ½ || 0 || ½ || 1 || 1 || 0 ||  || 0 || 1 ||5 || || 2580
|-
| 13 || align=left| || 2647 || ½ || ½ || 0 || 0 || ½ || ½ || 0 || ½ || 0 || 0 || 0 || 1 ||  || ½ ||4 ||  || 2519
|-
| 14 || align=left| || 2584 || ½ || 0 || ½ || 0 || ½ || 0 || ½ || 0 || ½ || ½ || 0 || 0 || ½ ||  ||3½ ||  || 2490
|}

{| class="wikitable" style="text-align: center;"
|+ 73rd Tata Steel Chess, grandmaster group C, 15–30 January 2011, Wijk aan Zee, Cat. XI (2507)
! !! Player !! Rating !! 1 !! 2 !! 3 !! 4 !! 5 !! 6 !! 7 !! 8 !! 9 !! 10 !! 11 !! 12 !! 13 !! 14 !! Total !! SB !! TPR
|-
| 1 || align=left| || 2570 ||  || ½ || 1 || 0 || 0 || 1 || 1 || ½ || 0 || 1 || 1 || 1 || 1 || 1 ||9 || || 2643
|-
| 2 || align=left| || 2530 || ½ ||  || ½ || 0 || 0 || ½ || 1 || 1 || 1 || 1 || ½ || 1 || 1 || ½ ||8½ || || 2615
|-
| 3 || align=left| || 2518 || 0 || ½ ||  || ½ || ½ || ½ || ½ || 1 || 1 || 1 || 0 || ½ || 1 || 1 ||8 || || 2593
|-
| 4 || align=left| || 2630 || 1 || 1 || ½ ||  || ½ || 0 || ½ || 1 || 0 || ½ || ½ || ½ || ½ || 1 ||7½ || 48.75 || 2555
|-
| 5 || align=left| || 2540 || 1 || 1 || ½ || ½ ||  || 0 || ½ || 0 || 0 || 1 || 0 || 1 || 1 || 1 ||7½ || 46.75 || 2562
|-
| 6 || align=left| || 2590 || 0 || ½ || ½ || 1 || 1 ||  || 0 || 0 || 1 || 1 || ½ || 1 || 0 || 1 ||7½ || 46.25 || 2558
|-
| 7 || align=left| || 2637 || 0 || 0 || ½ || ½ || ½ || 1 ||  || 0 || 1 || 0 || 1 || 1 || ½ || 1 ||7 || || 2526
|-
| 8 || align=left| || 2453 || ½ || 0 || 0 || 0 || 1 || 1 || 1 ||  || ½ || ½ || ½ || ½ || 1 || 0 ||6½ || 41.25 || 2511
|-
| 9 || align=left| || 2391 || 1 || 0 || 0 || 1 || 1 || 0 || 0 || ½ ||  || 0 || 1 || ½ || ½ || 1 ||6½ || 30.50 || 2516
|-
| 10 || align=left| || 2439 || 0 || 0 || 0 || ½ || 0 || 0 || 1 || ½ || 1 ||  || 1 || 1 || ½ || 0 ||5½ || || 2455
|-
| 11 || align=left| || 2439 || 0 || ½ || 1 || ½ || 1 || ½ || 0 || ½ || 0 || 0 ||  || 0 || 1 || 0 ||5 || || 2425
|-
| 12 || align=left| || 2443 || 0 || 0 || ½ || ½ || 0 || 0 || 0 || ½ || ½ || 0 || 1 ||  || ½ || 1 ||4½ || || 2402
|-
| 13 || align=left| || 2484 || 0 || 0 || 0 || ½ || 0 || 1 || ½ || 0 || ½ || ½ || 0 || ½ ||  || ½ ||4 || 25.00 || 2368
|-
| 14 || align=left| || 2437 || 0 || ½ || 0 || 0 || 0 || 0 || 0 || 1 || 0 || 1 || 1 || 0 || ½ ||  ||4 || 23.25 || 2372
|}

2012
{| class="wikitable" style="text-align: center;"
|+ 74th Tata Steel Chess, grandmaster group A, 14–29 January 2012, Wijk aan Zee, Cat. XXI (2755)
! !! Player !! Rating !! 1 !! 2 !! 3 !! 4 !! 5 !! 6 !! 7 !! 8 !! 9 !! 10 !! 11 !! 12 !! 13 !! 14 !! Total !! SB !! TPR
|-
|-style="background:#ccffcc;"
| 1 || align=left| || 2805 ||  ||0 ||½ ||1 ||½ ||1 ||1 ||1 || ½||1 ||½ ||1 ||0 ||1 ||9 ||  || 2892
|-
| 2 || align=left| ||2835 ||1 || ||½ ||½ ||½ ||½ ||½ ||0 ||½ ||1 ||1 ||1 ||½ || ½ ||8 || 50.25 || 2835
|-
| 3 || align=left| ||2773 ||½ ||½ || ||½ ||½ ||½ ||½ ||1 ||½ ||½ ||½ ||1 ||1 ||½ ||8 || 49.50 || 2840
|-
| 4 || align=left| ||2732 ||0 ||½ ||½ || ||½ ||½ ||½ ||1 ||½ ||1 ||1 ||½ ||½ ||1 ||8 || 47.50 || 2843
|-
| 5 || align=left| ||2763 ||½ ||½ ||½ ||½ || ||½ ||½ ||½ ||½ ||0 ||½ ||1 ||1 ||1 ||7½ || 46.25 || 2811
|-
| 6 || align=left| ||2759 ||0 ||½ ||½ ||½ ||½ || ||½ ||½ ||1 ||1 ||½ ||½ ||1 ||½ ||7½ || 44.75 || 2811
|-
| 7 || align=left| ||2732 ||0 ||½ ||½ ||½ ||½ ||½ || ||1 ||½ ||½ ||1 ||½ ||1 ||0 ||7 || || 2785
|-
| 8 || align=left| ||2766||0 ||1 ||0 ||0 ||½ ||½ ||0 || ||1 ||0 ||1 ||½ ||1 ||1 ||6½ || || 2753
|-
| 9 || align=left| ||2692 ||½ ||½ ||½ ||½ ||½ ||0 ||½ ||0 || ||½ ||½ ||½ ||½ ||½ ||5½ || || 2702
|-
| 10 || align=left| ||2739 ||0 ||0 ||½ ||0 ||1 ||0 ||½ ||1 ||½ || ||½ ||½ ||½ ||0 ||5 || 31.50 || 2669
|-
| 11 || align=left| ||2770 ||½ ||0 ||½ ||0 ||½ ||½ ||0 ||0 ||½ ||½ || ||½ ||½ ||1 ||5 || 30.50 || 2666
|-
| 12 || align=left| ||2761 ||0 ||0 ||0 ||½ ||0 ||½ ||½ ||½ ||½ ||½ ||½ || ||½ ||1 ||5 || 29.00 || 2667
|-
| 13 || align=left| ||2712 ||1 ||½ ||0 ||½ ||0 ||0 ||0 ||0 ||½ ||½ ||½ ||½ || ||½ ||4½ || 29.50 || 2648
|-
| 14 || align=left| ||2714 ||0 ||½ ||½ ||0 ||0 ||½ ||1 ||0 ||½ ||1 ||0 ||0 ||½ || ||4½ || 28.75 || 2648
|}

{| class="wikitable" style="text-align: center;"
|+ 74th Tata Steel Chess, grandmaster group B, 14–29 January 2012, Wijk aan Zee, Cat. XV (2603)
! !! Player !! Rating !! 1 !! 2 !! 3 !! 4 !! 5 !! 6 !! 7 !! 8 !! 9 !! 10 !! 11 !! 12 !! 13 !! 14 !! Total !! SB !! TPR
|-
| 1 || align=left| || 2665 ||  || ½ || 1 || ½ || ½ || ½ || 1 || ½ || 1 || 0 || 1 || 1 || ½ || 1 ||9 ||  || 2739
|-
| 2 || align=left| || 2677 || ½ ||  || ½ || ½ || 1 || ½ || ½ || ½ || ½ || 1 || 1 || 1 || ½ || ½ ||8½ || 52.25 || 2707
|-
| 3 || align=left| || 2691 || 0 || ½ ||  || ½ || ½ || ½ || 0 || 1 || 1 || 1 || ½ || 1 || 1 || 1 ||8½ || 47.75 || 2706
|-
| 4 || align=left| || 2596 || ½ || ½ || ½ ||  || 1 || ½ || ½ || 0 || ½ || 0 || 1 || 1 || 1 || 1 ||8 || 48.00 || 2690
|-
| 5 || align=left| || 2677 || ½ || 0 || ½ || 0 ||  || 1 || ½ || 1 || 1 || 0 || 1 || ½ || 1 || 1 ||8 || 46.75 || 2684
|-
| 6 || align=left| || 2581 || ½ || ½ || ½ || ½ || 0 ||  || 1 || 0 || 1 || 1 || ½ || 1 || ½ || ½ ||7½ || 46.00 || 2661
|-
| 7 || align=left| || 2568 || 0 || ½ || 1 || ½ || ½ || 0 ||  || ½ || 0 || ½ || 1 || 1 || 1 || 1 ||7½ || 43.00 || 2662
|-
| 8 || align=left| || 2684 || ½ || ½ || 0 || 1 || 0 || 1 || ½ ||  || ½ || 0 || ½ || ½ || ½ || 1 ||6½ ||  || 2596
|-
| 9 || align=left| || 2571 || 0 || ½ || 0 || ½ || 0 || 0 || 1 || ½ ||  || 1 || ½ || ½ || 1 || ½ ||6 ||  || 2576
|-
| 10 || align=left| || 2606 || 1 || 0 || 0 || 1 || 1 || 0 || ½ || 1 || 0 ||  || 0 || 0 || 0 || ½ ||5 ||  || 2515
|-
| 11 || align=left| || 2557 || 0 || 0 || ½ || 0 || 0 || ½ || 0 || ½ || ½ || 1 ||  || ½ || ½ || ½ ||4½ || 25.25 || 2496
|-
| 12 || align=left| || 2545 || 0 || 0 || 0 || 0 || ½ || 0 || 0 || ½ || ½ || 1 || ½ ||  || 1 || ½ ||4½ || 23.25 || 2497
|-
| 13 || align=left| || 2503 || ½ || ½ || 0 || 0 || 0 || ½ || 0 || ½ || 0 || 1 || ½ || 0 ||  || ½ ||4 ||  || 2469
|-
| 14 || align=left| || 2516 || 0 || ½ || 0 || 0 || 0 || ½ || 0 || 0 || ½ || ½ || ½ || ½ || ½ ||  ||3½ ||  || 2434
|}

{| class="wikitable" style="text-align: center;"
|+ 74th Tata Steel Chess, grandmaster group C, 14–29 January 2012, Wijk aan Zee, Cat. IX (2454)
! !! Player !! Rating !! 1 !! 2 !! 3 !! 4 !! 5 !! 6 !! 7 !! 8 !! 9 !! 10 !! 11 !! 12 !! 13 !! 14 !! Total !! SB !! TPR
|-
| 1 || align=left| || 2645 ||  || ½ || ½ || 1 || ½ || ½ || ½ || 1 || 1 || 1 || 1 || 1 || 1 || 1 ||10½ ||  || 2690
|-
| 2 || align=left| || 2549 || ½ ||  || ½ || ½ || 1 || 1 || 1 || ½ || 1 || 1 || 1 || 0 || 1 || 1 ||10 || || 2658
|-
| 3 || align=left| || 2527 || ½ || ½ ||  || ½ || ½ || ½ || ½ || ½ || 1 || ½ || ½ || 1 || 1 || 1 ||8½ || 49.75 || 2558
|-
| 4 || align=left| || 2561 || 0 || ½ || ½ ||  || 1 || ½ || 1 || ½ || ½ || ½ || ½ || 1 || 1 || 1 ||8½ || 48.75 || 2556
|-
| 5 || align=left| || 2532 || ½ || 0 || ½ || 0 ||  || ½ || 1 || ½ || ½ || 1 || 1 || ½ || 1 || 0 ||7 || 41.25 || 2477
|-
| 6 || align=left| || 2660 || ½ || 0 || ½ || ½ || ½ ||  || ½ || ½ || ½ || ½ || ½ || 1 || ½ || 1 ||7 || 40.75 || 2467
|-
| 7 || align=left| || 2454 || ½ || 0 || ½ || 0 || 0 || ½ ||  || 1 || ½ || 1 || 1 || ½ || 1 || ½ ||7 || 39.00 || 2483
|-
| 8 || align=left| || 2411 || 0 || ½ || ½ || ½ || ½ || ½ || 0 ||  || ½ || ½ || 0 || ½ || 1 || 1 ||6 ||  || 2428
|-
| 9 || align=left| || 2490 || 0 || 0 || 0 || ½ || ½ || ½ || ½ || ½ ||  || 1 || 0 || 1 || ½ || ½ ||5½ ||  || 2394
|-
| 10 || align=left| || 2279 || 0 || 0 || ½ || ½ || 0 || ½ || 0 || ½ || 0 ||  || 1 || ½ || 1 || ½ ||5 ||  || 2380
|-
| 11 || align=left| || 2326 || 0 || 0 || ½ || ½ || 0 || ½ || 0 || 1 || 1 || 0 ||  || 1 || 0 || 0 ||4½ ||  || 2354
|-
| 12 || align=left| || 2342 || 0 || 1 || 0 || 0 || ½ || 0 || ½ || ½ || 0 || ½ || 0 ||  || 0 || 1 ||4 || 26.00 || 2322
|-
| 13 || align=left| || 2290 || 0 || 0 || 0 || 0 || 0 || ½ || 0 || 0 || ½ || 0 || 1 || 1 ||  || 1 ||4 || 18.25 || 2326
|-
| 14 || align=left| || 2290 || 0 || 0 || 0 || 0 || 1 || 0 || ½ || 0 || ½ || ½ || 1 || 0 || 0 ||  ||3½ ||  || 2292
|}

2013
{| class="wikitable" style="text-align: center;"
|+ 75th Tata Steel Chess, grandmaster group A, 12–27 January 2013, Wijk aan Zee, Cat. XX (2732)
! !! Player !!  Rating !! 1 !! 2 !! 3 !! 4 !! 5 !! 6 !! 7 !! 8 !! 9 !! 10 !! 11 !! 12 !! 13 !! 14 !! Total !! SB !! TPR
|-
|-style="background:#ccffcc;"
| 1 || align=left| || 2861 ||  ||½ ||½ ||1 ||½ ||1 ||1 ||½ ||½ ||1 ||1 ||½ ||1 ||1 ||10 |||| 2933 
|-
| 2 || align=left| ||2802 ||½ || ||0 ||½ ||1 ||1 ||½ ||½ ||1 ||½ ||1 ||½ ||½ ||1 ||8½ |||| 2837
|-
| 3 || align=left| ||2772 ||½ ||1 || ||½ ||½ ||½ ||½ ||½ ||0 ||1 ||½ ||1 ||1 ||½ ||8 || 50.25 || 2816
|-
| 4 || align=left| ||2780 ||0 ||½ ||½ || ||½ ||½ ||½ ||½ ||1 ||1 ||1 ||½ ||½ ||1 ||8 || 46.75 || 2816
|-
| 5 || align=left| ||2735 ||½ ||0 ||½ ||½ || ||½ ||½ ||½ ||½ ||1 ||½ ||1 ||½ ||1 ||7½ |||| 2789 
|-
| 6 || align=left| ||2769 ||0 ||0 ||½ ||½ ||½ || ||½ ||½ ||1 ||½ ||1 ||1 ||½ ||½ ||7 |||| 2758
|-
| 7 || align=left| ||2698 ||0 ||½ ||½ ||½ ||½ ||½ || ||1 ||½ ||1 ||0 ||½ ||½ ||½ ||6½ |||| 2735 
|-
| 8 || align=left| ||2726 ||½ ||½ ||½ ||½ ||½ ||½ ||0 || ||½ ||½ ||0 ||1 ||½ ||½ ||6 || 39.00 || 2704
|-
| 9 || align=left| ||2752 ||½ ||0 ||1 ||0 ||½ ||0 ||½ ||½ || ||0 ||1 ||½ ||1 ||½ ||6 || 36.50 || 2702
|-
| 10 || align=left| ||2679 ||0 ||½ ||0 ||0 ||0 ||½ ||0 ||½ ||1 || ||½ ||1 ||1 ||1 ||6 || 31.50 || 2707
|-
| 11 || align=left| ||2603 ||0 ||0 ||½ ||0 ||½ ||0 ||1 ||1 ||0 ||½ || ||½ ||½ ||1 ||5½ |||| 2685
|-
| 12 || align=left| ||2781 ||½ ||½ ||0 ||½ ||0 ||0 ||½ ||0 ||½ ||0 ||½ || ||1 ||1 ||5 |||| 2642
|-
| 13 || align=left| ||2627 ||0 ||½ ||0 ||½ ||½ ||½ ||½ ||½ ||0 ||0 ||½ ||0 || ||½ ||4 |||| 2599
|-
| 14 || align=left| ||2667 ||0 ||0 ||½ ||0 ||0 ||½ ||½ ||½ ||½ ||0 ||0 ||0 ||½ || ||3 ||||2526
|}

{| class="wikitable" style="text-align: center;"
|+ 75th Tata Steel Chess, grandmaster group B, 12–27 January 2013, Wijk aan Zee, Cat. XV (2620)
! !! Player !!  Rating !! 1 !! 2 !! 3 !! 4 !! 5 !! 6 !! 7 !! 8 !! 9 !! 10 !! 11 !! 12 !! 13 !! 14 !! Total !! SB !! TPR
|-
| 1 || align=left| || 2708 ||  || 1 || 1 || ½ || ½ || ½ || 1 || 0 || 1 || 0 || 1 || ½ || 1 || 1 ||9 || 56.25 || 2755
|-
| 2 || align=left| || 2621 || 0 ||  || 0 || 1 || ½ || 1 || 1 || 1 || ½ || ½ || ½ || 1 || 1 || 1 ||9 || 52.75 || 2761
|-
| 3 || align=left| || 2615 || 0 || 1 ||  || ½ || ½ || 1 || 0 || ½ || 1 || ½ || 1 || 1 || ½ || 1 ||8½ || 50.50 || 2731
|-
| 4 || align=left| || 2688 || ½ || 0 || ½ ||  || ½ || 1 || ½ || ½ || 1 || 1 || ½ || 1 || ½ || 1 ||8½ || 46.75 || 2725
|-
| 5 || align=left| || 2600 || ½ || ½ || ½ || ½ ||  || 0 || 1 || 1 || 0 || ½ || ½ || 1 || ½ || 1 ||7½ || || 2679
|-
| 6 || align=left| || 2686 || ½ || 0 || 0 || 0 || 1 ||  || ½ || 1 || ½ || 1 || 1 || ½ || 1 || 0 ||7 || 41.25 || 2644
|-
| 7 || align=left| || 2566 || 0 || 0 || 1 || ½ || 0 || ½ ||  || ½ || ½ || 0 || 1 || 1 || 1 || 1 ||7 || 39.00 || 2653 
|-
| 8 || align=left| || 2655 || 1 || 0 || ½ || ½ || 0 || 0 || ½ ||  || ½ || 1 || ½ || 1 || 1 || 0 ||6½ || || 2618
|-
| 9 || align=left| || 2630 || 0 || ½ || 0 || 0 || 1 || ½ || ½ || ½ ||  || ½ || ½ || ½ || ½ || 1 ||6 || || 2591
|-
| 10 || align=left| || 2581 || 1 || ½ || ½ || 0 || ½ || 0 || 1 || 0 || ½ ||  || 0 || 0 || ½ || 1 ||5½ || || 2566
|-
| 11 || align=left| || 2572 || 0 || ½ || 0 || ½ || ½ || 0 || 0 || ½ || ½ || 1 ||  || 0 || 1 || 0 ||4½ || 28.25 || 2514
|-
| 12 || align=left| || 2619 || ½ || 0 || 0 || 0 || 0 || ½ || 0 || 0 || ½ || 1 || 1 ||  || 0 || 1 ||4½ || 24.50 || 2510
|-
| 13 || align=left| || 2587 || 0 || 0 || ½ || ½ || ½ || 0 || 0 || 0 || ½ || ½ || 0 || 1 ||  || ½ ||4 || || 2482
|-
| 14 || align=left| || 2556 || 0 || 0 || 0 || 0 || 0 || 1 || 0 || 1 || 0 || 0 || 1 || 0 || ½ ||  ||3½ || || 2450
|}

{| class="wikitable" style="text-align: center;"
|+ 75th Tata Steel Chess, grandmaster group C, 12–27 January 2013, Wijk aan Zee, Cat. X (2476)
! !! Player !!  Rating !! 1 !! 2 !! 3 !! 4 !! 5 !! 6 !! 7 !! 8 !! 9 !! 10 !! 11 !! 12 !! 13 !! 14 !! Total !! SB !! TPR
|-
| 1 || align=left| || 2572 ||  || ½ || ½ || 1 || 1 || ½ || 1 || 1 || ½ || 1 || 1 || 1 || 1 || 1 ||11 || || 2764
|-
| 2 || align=left| || 2617 || ½ ||  || 1 || ½ || ½ || ½ || 1 || 1 || 1 || 1 || 1 || 1 || ½ || 1 ||10½ || || 2716 
|-
| 3 || align=left| || 2508 || ½ || 0 ||  || ½ || ½ || 1 || 1 || ½ || ½ || ½ || ½ || 1 || 1 || 1 ||8½ || || 2583 
|-
| 4 || align=left| || 2543 || 0 || ½ || ½ ||  || ½ || 1 || 0 || 1 || 0 || ½ || 1 || 1 || 1 || 1 ||8 || || 2558
|-
| 5 || align=left| || 2579 || 0 || ½ || ½ || ½ ||  || ½ || ½ || ½ || 1 || ½ || ½ || 1 || ½ || 1 ||7½ || || 2525
|-
| 6 || align=left| || 2492 || ½ || ½ || 0 || 0 || ½ ||  || ½ || 0 || 1 || 1 || ½ || ½ || 1 || 1 ||7 || 39.00 || 2504
|-
| 7 || align=left| || 2445 || 0 || 0 || 0 || 1 || ½ || ½ ||  || 1 || 0 || 1 || 0 || 1 || 1 || 1 ||7 || 36.75 || 2507 
|-
| 8 || align=left| || 2516 || 0 || 0 || ½ || 0 || ½ || 1 || 0 ||  || 1 || 1 || ½ || ½ || ½ || 1 ||6½ || || 2473
|-
| 9 || align=left| || 2400 || ½ || 0 || ½ || 1 || 0 || 0 || 1 || 0 ||  || ½ || ½ || 1 || ½ || 0 ||5½ || 34.75 || 2425 
|-
| 10 || align=left| || 2521 || 0 || 0 || ½ || ½ || ½ || 0 || 0 || 0 || ½ ||  || 1 || ½ || 1 || 1 ||5½ || 27.00 || 2415
|-
| 11 || align=left| || 2321 || 0 || 0 || ½ || 0 || ½ || ½ || 1 || ½ || ½ || 0 ||  || 0 || ½ || ½ ||4½ || || 2378
|-
| 12 || align=left| || 2402 || 0 || 0 || 0 || 0 || 0 || ½ || 0 || ½ || 0 || ½ || 1 ||  || ½ || ½ ||3½ || || 2306  
|-
| 13 || align=left| || 2450 || 0 || ½ || 0 || 0 || ½ || 0 || 0 || ½ || ½ || 0 || ½ || ½ ||  || 0 ||3 || 19.00 || 2267
|-
| 14 || align=left| || 2295 || 0 || 0 || 0 || 0 || 0 || 0 || 0 || 0 || 1 || 0 || ½ || ½ || 1 ||  ||3 || 12.50 || 2279 
|}

2014
{| class="wikitable" style="text-align: center;"
|+ 76th Tata Steel Masters, 11–26 January 2014, Wijk aan Zee — Eindhoven — Amsterdam, Cat. XX (2743)
! !! Player !! Rating !! 1 !! 2 !! 3 !! 4 !! 5 !! 6 !! 7 !! 8 !! 9 !! 10 !! 11 !! 12 !! Total !! SB !! TPR
|-
|-style="background:#ccffcc;"
| 1 || align=left| ||2812 || ||½ ||1 ||1 ||1 ||1 ||½ ||0 ||1 ||½ ||½ ||1 ||8 || || 2911
|-
| 2 || align=left| ||2734 ||½ || ||½ ||½ ||½ ||½ ||1 ||½ ||½ ||½ ||½ ||1 ||6½|| 34.25 || 2809
|-
| 3 || align=left| ||2759 || 0 ||½ || ||0 ||½ ||½ ||½ ||1 ||½ ||1 ||1 ||1 ||6½|| 31.00 || 2806
|-
| 4 || align=left| ||2782 ||0 ||½ ||1 || ||0 ||½ ||½ ||1 ||½ ||1 ||1 ||0 ||6 || 31.00 || 2775
|-
| 5 || align=left| ||2754 ||0 ||½ ||½ ||1 || ||1 ||0 ||½ ||½ ||½ ||1 ||½ ||6 || 31.00 || 2778
|-
| 6 || align=left| ||2719 ||0 ||½ ||½ ||½ ||0 || ||½ ||1 ||½ ||1 ||1 ||½ ||6 || 29.50 || 2781
|-
| 7 || align=left| ||2706 ||½ ||0 ||½ ||½ ||1 ||½ || ||½ ||1 ||0 ||0 ||1 ||5½|| || 2746
|-
| 8 || align=left| ||2672 ||1 ||½ ||0 ||0 ||½ ||0 ||½ || ||1 ||0 ||½ ||1 ||5 || 27.25 || 2713
|-
| 9 || align=left| ||2789 ||0 ||½ ||½ ||½ ||½ ||½ ||0 ||0 || ||½ ||1 ||1 ||5 || 24.75 || 2703
|-
| 10 || align=left| ||2777 ||½ ||½ ||0 ||0 ||½ ||0 ||1 ||1 ||½ || ||0 ||½ ||4½|| || 2675
|-
| 11 || align=left| ||2691 ||½ ||½ ||0 ||0 ||0 ||0 ||1 ||½ ||0 ||1 || ||0 ||3½|| 19.75 || 2614
|-
| 12 || align=left| ||2718 ||0 ||0 ||0 ||1 ||½ ||½ ||0 ||0 ||0 ||½ ||1 || ||3½|| 17.75 || 2612
|}

{| class="wikitable" style="text-align: center;"
|+2014 Tata Steel Challengers, 11–26 January 2014, Wijk aan Zee, Netherlands, Category XIV (2579)
! !! Player !! Rating !! 1 !! 2 !! 3 !! 4 !! 5 !! 6 !! 7 !! 8 !! 9 !! 10 !! 11 !! 12 !! 13 !! 14 !! Total !! SB !! TPR
|-
| 1 || align=left| || 2637 ||  || ½ || ½ || ½ || 1 || ½ || 1 || 1 || 1 || ½ || 1 || 1 || ½ || 1 || 10 || || 2785
|-
| 2 || align="left" | || 2607 || ½ ||  || ½ || ½ || 1 || ½ || 0 || 1 || ½ || 1 || ½ || 1 || ½ || 1 || 8½ || 51.50 || 2686
|-
| 3 || align="left" | || 2710 || ½ || ½ ||  || ½ || 0 || 1 || 1 || ½ || 1 || 0 || ½ || 1 || 1 || 1 || 8½ || 49.50 || 2679
|-
| 4 || align="left" | || 2566 || ½ || ½ || ½ ||  || ½ || ½ || 0 || 1 || ½ || 1 || 1 || ½ || ½ || 1 || 8 || 47.75 || 2667
|-
| 5 || align="left" | || 2593 || 0 || 0 || 1 || ½ ||  || ½ || 1 || 0 || 1 || 0 || 1 || 1 || 1 || 1 || 8 || 44.00 || 2665
|-
| 6 || align="left" | || 2560 || ½ || ½ || 0 || ½ || ½ ||  || 1 || ½ || ½ || 1 || ½ || 0 || 1 || ½ || 7 || 43.50 || 2609
|-
| 7 || align="left" | || 2677 || 0 || 1 || 0 || 1 || 0 || 0 ||  || 1 || ½ || 0 || ½ || 1 || 1 || 1 || 7 || 38.75 || 2600
|-
| 8 || align="left" | || 2553 || 0 || 0 || ½ || 0 || 1 || ½ || 0 ||  || ½ || 1 || 1 || ½ || 1 || 1 || 7 || 37.00 || 2610
|-
| 9 || align="left" | || 2711 || 0 || ½ || 0 || ½ || 0 || ½ || ½ || ½ ||  || 1 || ½ || 1 || 1 || 1 || 7 || 36.50 || 2597
|-
| 10 || align="left" | || 2602 || ½ || 0 || 1 || 0 || 1 || 0 || 1 || 0 || 0 ||  || ½ || ½ || 1 || ½ || 6 || || 2548
|-
| 11 || align="left" | || 2457 || 0 || ½ || ½ || 0 || 0 || ½ || ½ || 0 || ½ || ½ ||  || ½ || 1 || 0 || 4½ || 27.25 || 2478
|- 
| 12 || align="left" | || 2567 || 0 || 0 || 0 || ½ || 0 || 1 || 0 || ½ || 0 || ½ || ½ ||  || ½ || 1 || 4½ || 23.25 || 2470
|-
| 13 || align="left" | || 2430 || ½ || ½ || 0 || ½ || 0 || 0 || 0 || 0 || 0 || 0 || 0 || ½ ||  || 1 || 3 ||  || 2379
|-
| 14 || align="left" | || 2431 || 0 || 0 || 0 || 0 || 0 || ½ || 0 || 0 || 0 || ½ || 1 || 0 || 0 ||  || 2 ||  || 2294
|}

2015
{| class="wikitable" style="text-align: center;"
|+ 77th Tata Steel Masters, 10–25 January 2015, Wijk aan Zee — Rotterdam — The Hague, Netherlands, Category XX (2746)
! !! Player !!  Rating !! 1 !! 2 !! 3 !! 4 !! 5 !! 6 !! 7 !! 8 !! 9 !! 10 !! 11 !! 12 !! 13 !! 14 !! Total !! SB !! TPR
|-
|-style="background:#ccffcc;"
| 1 || align=left| || 2862 ||  || ½ || ½ || ½ || ½ || ½ || 1 || 1 || 0 || 1 || 1 || ½ || 1 || 1 ||9 ||  || 2878
|-
| 2 || align=left| || 2757 || ½ ||  || 1 || ½ || 1 || 0 || 1 || ½ || ½ || ½ || 1 || 1 || ½ || ½ ||8½ || 54.25 || 2855
|-
| 3 || align=left| || 2784 || ½ || 0 ||  || 1 || 1 || ½ || ½ || ½ || ½ || ½ || ½ || 1 || 1 || 1 ||8½ || 51.25 || 2853 
|-
| 4 || align=left| || 2762 || ½ || ½ || 0 ||  || ½ || 1 || ½ || ½ || ½ || 1 || ½ || 1 || 1 || 1 ||8½ || 49.25 || 2854
|-
| 5 || align=left| || 2732 || ½ || 0 || 0 || ½ ||  || ½ || 0 || 1 || 1 || 1 || 1 || 1 || 1 || 1 ||8½ || 46.00 || 2857
|-
| 6 || align=left| || 2715 || ½ || 1 || ½ || 0 || ½ ||  || ½ || ½ || ½ || ½ || ½ || ½ || 1 || 1 ||7½ || || 2805
|-
| 7 || align=left| || 2820 || 0 || 0 || ½ || ½ || 1 || ½ ||  || ½ || 0 || ½ || ½ || 1 || 1 || 1 ||7 || || 2769
|-
| 8 || align=left| || 2734 || 0 || ½ || ½ || ½ || 0 || ½ || ½ ||  || 1 || ½ || ½ || 1 || ½ || 0 ||6 || || 2718 
|-
| 9 || align=left| || 2744 || 1 || ½ || ½ || ½ || 0 || ½ || 1 || 0 ||  || ½ || ½ || 0 || ½ || 0 ||5½ || 39.75 || 2689 
|-
| 10 || align=left| || 2797 || 0 || ½ || ½ || 0 || 0 || ½ || ½ || ½ || ½ ||  || ½ || ½ || ½ || 1 ||5½ || 31.25 || 2685 
|-
| 11 || align=left| || 2673 || 0 || 0 || ½ || ½ || 0 || ½ || ½ || ½ || ½ || ½ ||  || ½ || 0 || 1 ||5 || || 2664
|-
| 12 || align=left| || 2666 || ½ || 0 || 0 || 0 || 0 || ½ || 0 || 0 || 1 || ½ || ½ ||  || ½ || 1 ||4½ || || 2642
|-
| 13 || align=left| || 2667 || 0 || ½ || 0 || 0 || 0 || 0 || 0 || ½ || ½ || ½ || 1 || ½ ||  || ½ ||4 || || 2611
|-
| 14 || align=left| || 2727 || 0 || ½ || 0 || 0 || 0 || 0 || 0 || 1 || 1 || 0 || 0 || 0 || ½ ||  ||3 || || 2536
|}

{| class="wikitable" style="text-align: center;"
|+2015 Tata Steel Challengers, 10–25 January 2015, Wijk aan Zee, Netherlands, Category XIII (2561)
! !! Player !! Rating !! 1 !! 2 !! 3 !! 4 !! 5 !! 6 !! 7 !! 8 !! 9 !! 10 !! 11 !! 12 !! 13 !! 14 !! Total !! SB !! TPR
|-
| 1 || align=left| || 2675 ||  || ½ || ½ || ½ || ½ || 1 || 1 || 1 || 1 || 1 || 1 || 1 || ½ || 1 || 10½ || || 2804
|-
| 2 || align="left" | || 2729 || ½ ||  || ½ || 1 || 1 || ½ || ½ || ½ || ½ || 1 || 1 || 1 || 1 || 1 || 10 || || 2760
|-
| 3 || align="left" | || 2652 || ½ || ½ ||  || 1 || ½ || ½ || ½ || 1 || ½ || 1 || 1 || 1 || ½ || ½ || 9 || || 2695
|-
| 4 || align="left" | || 2615 || ½ || 0 || 0 ||  || 0 || 1 || 1 || ½ || 1 || 1 || ½ || 1 || 1 || 1 || 8½ || || 2667
|-
| 5 || align="left" | || 2603 || ½ || 0 || ½ || 1 ||  || ½ || ½ || 0 || 0 || 1 || 1 || ½ || 1 || 1 || 7½ || 43.00 || 2615
|-
| 6 || align="left" | || 2511 || 0 || ½ || ½ || 0 || ½ ||  || 1 || ½ || 1 || 0 || 1 || 1 || ½ || 1 || 7½ || 41.75 || 2622
|-
| 7 || align="left" | || 2608 || 0 || ½ || ½ || 0 || ½ || 0 ||  || ½ || 1 || ½ || 1 || 1 || ½ || 1 || 7 || || 2587
|-
| 8 || align="left" | || 2613 || 0 || ½ || 0 || ½ || 1 || ½ || ½ ||  || 0 || 1 || ½ || ½ || 1 || ½ || 6½ || || 2557
|-
| 9 || align="left" | || 2538 || 0 || ½ || ½ || 0 || 1 || 0 || 0 || 1 ||  || ½ || 0 || 0 || ½ || 1 || 5 || || 2476
|-
| 10 || align="left" | || 2563 || 0 || 0 || 0 || 0 || 0 || 1 || ½ || 0 || ½ ||  || 0 || 1 || 1 || ½ || 4½ || 22.50 || 2451
|-
| 11 || align="left" | || 2517 || 0 || 0 || 0 || ½ || 0 || 0 || 0 || ½ || 1 || 1 ||  || ½ || ½ || ½ || 4½ || 22.25 || 2455
|- 
| 12 || align="left" | || 2485 || 0 || 0 || 0 || 0 || ½ || 0 || 0 || ½ || 1 || 0 || ½ ||  || ½ || 1 || 4 ||  || 2437
|-
| 13 || align="left" | || 2291 || ½ || 0 || ½ || 0 || 0 || ½ || ½ || 0 || ½ || 0 || ½ || ½ ||  || 0 || 3½ ||  || 2407
|-
| 14 || align="left" | || 2593 || 0 || 0 || ½ || 0 || 0 || 0 || 0 || ½ || 0 || ½ || ½ || 0 || 1 ||  || 3 ||  || 2348
|}

2016
{| class="wikitable" style="text-align: center;"
|+78th Tata Steel Masters, 16–31 January 2016, Wijk aan Zee — Amsterdam — Utrecht, Netherlands, Category XX (2748)
! !! Player !! Rating !! 1 !! 2 !! 3 !! 4 !! 5 !! 6 !! 7 !! 8 !! 9 !! 10 !! 11 !! 12 !! 13 !! 14 !! Total !! SB !! TPR
|-
|-style="background:#ccffcc;"
| 1 || align=left| ||2844 || ||½ ||½ ||½ ||½ ||1 ||½ ||½ ||½ ||½ ||1 ||1 ||1 ||1 ||9 || || 2881
|-
| 2 || align=left| ||2787 ||½ || ||1 ||½ ||½ ||1 ||1 ||½ ||½ ||0 ||0 ||½ ||1 ||1 ||8 || 51.75 ||2831
|-
| 3 || align=left| ||2766 ||½ ||0 || ||½ ||½ ||1 ||½ ||½ ||1 ||½ ||1 ||½ ||1 ||½  ||8 ||  49.25|| 2833
|-
| 4 || align=left| ||2773 ||½ ||½ ||½ || ||1 ||½ ||½ ||½ ||½ ||½ ||½ ||½ ||½ ||½  ||7 || 45.50 || 2775
|-
| 5 || align=left| ||2798 ||½ ||½ ||½ ||0 || ||½ ||½ ||1 ||½ ||½ ||½ ||½ ||½ ||1 ||7 || 44.25 || 2773
|-
| 6 || align=left| ||2760 ||0 ||0 ||0 ||½ ||½ || ||½ ||1 ||½ ||1 ||½ ||1 ||½ ||1 ||7 || 40.50 || 2776
|-
| 7 || align=left| ||2706 ||½ ||0 ||½ ||½ ||½ ||½ || ||½ ||½ ||1 ||½ ||½ ||½ ||½ ||6½ || 41.00 || 2751
|-
| 8 || align=left| ||2747 ||½ ||½ ||½ ||½ ||0 ||0 ||½ || ||½ ||½ ||½ ||1 ||1 ||½ ||6½ || 40.25 || 2748
|-
| 9 || align=left| ||2769 ||½ ||½ ||0 ||½ ||½ ||½ ||½ ||½ || ||½ ||1 ||½ ||0 ||½ ||6 || || 2769
|-
| 10 || align=left| ||2730 ||½ ||1 ||½ ||½ ||½ ||0 ||0 ||½ ||½ || ||½ ||0 ||½ ||½ ||5½ || 37.50 || 2692
|-
| 11 || align=left| ||2728 ||0 ||1 ||0 ||½ ||½ ||½ ||½ ||½ ||0 ||½ || ||½ ||½ ||½ ||5½ || 35.25 || 2692
|-
| 12 || align=left| ||2673 ||0 ||½ ||½ ||½ ||½ ||0 ||½ ||0 ||½ ||1 ||½ || ||½ ||0 ||5 || 32.00 ||2666
|-
| 13 || align=left| ||2744 ||0 ||0 ||0 ||½ ||½ ||½ ||½ ||0 ||1 ||½ ||½ ||½ || ||½ ||5 || 30.25 || 2661
|-
| 14 || align=left| ||2640 ||0 ||0 ||½ ||½ ||0 ||0 ||½ ||½ ||½ ||½ ||½ ||1 ||½ || ||5 || 30.00 || 2669
|}

{| class="wikitable" style="text-align: center;"
|+2016 Tata Steel Challengers, 16–31 January 2016, Wijk aan Zee, Netherlands, Category XIII (2569)
! !! Player !! Rating !! 1 !! 2 !! 3 !! 4 !! 5 !! 6 !! 7 !! 8 !! 9 !! 10 !! 11 !! 12 !! 13 !! 14 !! Total !! SB !! TPR
|-
| 1 || align=left| || 2653 ||  || 1 || 1 || ½ || ½ || ½ || 0 || 1 || ½ || ½ || 1 || ½ || 1 || 1 || 9 || 56.25 || 2704
|-
| 2 || align="left" | || 2653 || 0 ||  || ½ || 1 || 1 || ½ || 1 || ½ || ½ || 1 || ½ || 1 || ½ || 1 || 9 || 53.50 || 2704
|-
| 3 || align="left" | || 2644 || 0 || ½ ||  || 1 || 1 || ½ || ½ || ½ || ½ || 1 || 1 || 1 || ½ || 1 || 9 || 53.25 || 2705
|-
| 4 || align="left" | || 2607 || ½ || 0 || 0 ||  || ½ || ½ || 0 || ½ || 1 || ½ || 1 || ½ || 1 || 1 || 7 || 39.25 || 2595
|-
| 5 || align="left" | || 2567 || ½ || 0 || 0 || ½ ||  || ½ || 1 || ½ || 1 || 0 || 0 || 1 || 1 || 1 || 7 || 39.00 || 2598
|-
| 6 || align="left" | || 2679 || ½ || ½ || ½ || ½ || ½ ||  || ½ || ½ || ½ || ½ || ½ || 1 || ½ || 0 || 6½ || 43.75 || 2561
|-
| 7 || align="left" | || 2541 || 1 || 0 || ½ || 1 || 0 || ½ ||  || 0 || 1 || 1 || 0 || 0 || ½ || 1 || 6½ || 41.00 || 2571
|-
| 8 || align="left" | || 2556 || 0 || ½ || ½ || ½ || ½ || ½ || 1 ||  || ½ || 0 || 1 || 0 || ½ || 1 || 6½ || 39.25 || 2570
|-
| 9 || align="left" | || 2627 || ½ || ½ || ½ || 0 || 0 || ½ || 0 || ½ ||  || 1 || ½ || ½ || 1 || 1 || 6½ || 38.50 || 2565
|-
| 10 || align="left" | || 2578 || ½ || 0 || 0 || ½ || 1 || ½ || 0 || 1 || 0 ||  || 1 || 1 || 0 || 1 || 6½ || 37.75 || 2569
|-
| 11 || align="left" | || 2548 || 0 || ½ || 0 || 0 || 1 || ½ || 1 || 0 || ½ || 0 ||  || ½ || 1 || 1 || 6 ||  || 2542
|- 
| 12 || align="left" | || 2485 || ½ || 0 || 0 || ½ || 0 || 0 || 1 || 1 || ½ || 0 || ½ ||  || 1 || 0 || 5 ||  || 2489
|-
| 13 || align="left" | || 2441 || 0 || ½ || ½ || 0 || 0 || ½ || ½ || ½ || 0 || 1 || 0 || 0 ||  || 1 || 4½ ||  || 2469
|-
| 14 || align="left" | || 2391 || 0 || 0 || 0 || 0 || 0 || 1 || 0 || 0 || 0 || 0 || 0 || 1 || 0 ||  || 2 ||  || 2287
|}

2017
{| class="wikitable" style="text-align: center;"
|+79th Tata Steel Masters, 14–29 January 2017, Wijk aan Zee — Haarlem — Rotterdam, Netherlands, Cat. XXI (2751)
!
!Player
!Rating
!1
!2
!3
!4
!5
!6
!7
!8
!9
!10
!11
!12
!13
!14
!Total
!SB
!TPR
|-
|-style="background:#ccffcc;"
|1
|align=left|
|2808
|
|½
|½
|½
|½
|½
|½
|½
|1
|½
|1
|1
|1
|1
|9
|
|2888
|-
|2
|align=left|
|2840
|½
|
|½
|½
|1
|½
|1
|½
|½
|½
|1
|½
|0
|1
|8
|
|2831
|-
|3
|align=left|
|2653
|½
|½
|
|½
|½
|1
|0
|½
|0
|1
|1
|½
|1
|½
|7½
|47.00
|2816
|-
|4
|align=left|
|2780
|½
|½
|½
|
|½
|0
|1
|1
|½
|0
|½
|½
|1
|1
|7½
|46.00
|2806
|-
|5
|align=left|
|2706
|½
|0
|½
|½
|
|1
|½
|½
|½
|½
|0
|1
|1
|1
|7½
|44.75
|2812
|-
|6
|align=left|
|2785
|½
|½
|0
|1
|0
|
|½
|½
|½
|1
|½
|½
|½
|1
|7
|43.00
|2777
|-
|7
|align=left|
|2755
|½
|0
|1
|0
|½
|½
|
|½
|½
|½
|½
|½
|1
|1
|7
|42.00
|2780
|-
|8
|align=left|
|2773
|½
|½
|½
|0
|½
|½
|½
|
|½
|½
|½
|1
|½
|½
|6½
|
|2749
|-
|9
|align=left|
|2766
|0
|½
|1
|½
|½
|½
|½
|½
|
|½
|½
|½
|½
|0
|6
|40.00
|2721
|-
|10
|align=left|
|2736
|½
|½
|0
|1
|½
|0
|½
|½
|½
|
|½
|½
|½
|½
|6
|39.00
|2723
|-
|11
|align=left|
|2750
|0
|0
|0
|½
|1
|½
|½
|½
|½
|½
|
|½
|½
|1
|6
|35.75
|2722
|-
|12
|align=left|
|2767
|0
|½
|½
|½
|0
|½
|½
|0
|½
|½
|½
|
|½
|½
|5
|
|2663
|-
|13
|align=left|
|2702
|0
|1
|0
|0
|0
|½
|0
|½
|½
|½
|½
|½
|
|½
|4½
|
|2645
|-
|14
|align=left|
|2695
|0
|0
|½
|0
|0
|0
|0
|½
|1
|½
|0
|½
|½
|
|3½
|
|2580
|}

{| class="wikitable" style="text-align: center;"
|+2017 Tata Steel Challengers, 14–29 January 2017, Wijk aan Zee, Netherlands, Category XIV (2593)
! !! Player !! Rating !! 1 !! 2 !! 3 !! 4 !! 5 !! 6 !! 7 !! 8 !! 9 !! 10 !! 11 !! 12 !! 13 !! 14 !! Total !! SB !! TPR
|-
| 1 || align=left| || 2665 ||  || 1 || 0 || 1 || ½ || 0 || 1 || ½ || ½ || 1 || 1 || 1 || ½ || 1 || 9 || 52.75 || 2728
|-
| 2 || align="left" | || 2697 || 0 ||  || 1 || 1 || ½ || ½ || ½ || ½ || ½ || ½ || 1 || 1 || 1 || 1 || 9 || 51.50 || 2726
|-
| 3 || align="left" | || 2667 || 1 || 0 ||  || 0 || ½ || 1 || 0 || ½ || 1 || ½ || 1 || 1 || 1 || 1 || 8½ ||  || 2697
|-
| 4 || align="left" | || 2603 || 0 || 0 || 1 ||  || 1 || 1 || ½ || ½ || ½ || ½ || 1 || 1 || ½ || ½ || 8 || 49.00 || 2679
|-
| 5 || align="left" | || 2612 || ½ || ½ || ½ || 0 ||  || 0 || 1 || ½ || 1 || 1 || 1 || 1 || ½ || ½ || 8 || 47.75 || 2678
|-
| 6 || align="left" | || 2667 || 1 || ½ || 0 || 0 || 1 ||  || 0 || ½ || ½ || 1 || ½ || 1 || 1 || 1 || 8 || 45.25 || 2674
|-
| 7 || align="left" | || 2584 || 0 || ½ || 1 || ½ || 0 || 1 ||  || ½ || ½ || ½ || ½ || ½ || 1 || 1 || 7½ ||  || 2650
|-
| 8 || align="left" | || 2605 || ½ || ½ || ½ || ½ || ½ || ½ || ½ ||  || ½ || ½ || ½ || 0 || 1 || 1 || 7 || 42.50 || 2621
|-
| 9 || align="left" | || 2642 || ½ || ½ || 0 || ½ || 0 || ½ || ½ || ½ ||  || ½ || 1 || ½ || 1 || 1 || 7 || 38.50 || 2618
|-
| 10 || align="left" | || 2608 || 0 || ½ || ½ || ½ || 0 || 0 || ½ || ½ || ½ ||  || 0 || ½ || 1 || 1 || 5½ ||  || 2535
|-
| 11 || align="left" | || 2499 || 0 || 0 || 0 || 0 || 0 || ½ || ½ || ½ || 0 || 1 ||  || 0 || 1 || 1 || 4½ ||  || 2490
|- 
| 12 || align="left" | || 2612 || 0 || 0 || 0 || 0 || 0 || 0 || ½ || 1 || ½ || ½ || 1 ||  || 0 || ½ || 4 ||  || 2450
|-
| 13 || align="left" | || 2467 || ½ || 0 || 0 || ½ || ½ || 0 || 0 || 0 || 0 || 0 || 0 || 1 ||  || 1 || 3½ ||  || 2427
|-
| 14 || align="left" | || 2370 || 0 || 0 || 0 || ½ || ½ || 0 || 0 || 0 || 0 || 0 || 0 || ½ || 0 ||  || 1½ ||  || 2274
|}

2018
{| class="wikitable" style="text-align: center;"
|+80th Tata Steel Masters, 13–28 January 2018, Wijk aan Zee — Groningen — Hilversum, Netherlands, Category XX (2750)
! !! Player !! Rating !! 1 !! 2 !! 3 !! 4 !! 5 !! 6 !! 7 !! 8 !! 9 !! 10 !! 11 !! 12 !! 13 !! 14 !! Total !! TB !! SB !! TPR
|-
|-style="background:#ccffcc;"
| 1 || align=left| || 2834 || || ½ || ½ || ½ || ½ || 1 || ½ || ½ || ½ || 1 || ½ || 1 || 1 || 1 || 9 || 1½ ||  || 2885
|-
| 2 || align="left" | || 2752 || ½ ||  || 1 || 1 || ½ || ½ || ½ || ½ || ½ || ½ || ½ || 1 || 1 || 1 || 9 || ½ || || 2891
|-
| 3 || align="left" | || 2787 || ½ || 0 ||  || ½ || 1 || ½ || 0 || 1 || 1 || ½ || 1 || 1 || 1 || ½ || 8½ || || 49.50 || 2857
|-
| 4 || align="left" | || 2804 || ½ || 0 || ½ ||  || ½ || ½ || ½ || 1 || 1 || ½ || 1 || ½ || 1 || 1 || 8½ || || 48.00 || 2856
|-
| 5 || align="left" | || 2767 || ½ || ½ || 0 || ½ ||  || ½ || ½ || ½ || ½ || 1 || 1 || 1 || ½ || 1 || 8 || || 46.00 || 2836
|-
| 6 || align="left" | || 2792 || 0 || ½ || ½ || ½ || ½ ||  || ½ || ½ || 1 || 1 || ½ || ½ || 1 || 1 || 8 || || 45.25 || 2834
|-
| 7 || align="left" | || 2753 || ½ || ½ || 1 || ½ || ½ || ½ ||  || ½ || ½ || ½ || 1 || ½ || ½ || ½ || 7½ || || || 2807
|-
| 8 || align="left" | || 2768 || ½ || ½ || 0 || 0 || ½ || ½ || ½ ||  || ½ || ½ || ½ || ½ || ½ || 1 || 6 ||  || || 2720
|-
| 9 || align="left" | || 2743 || ½ || ½ || 0 || 0 || ½ || 0 || ½ || ½ ||  || 1 || ½ || ½ || ½ || ½ || 5½ || || || 2694
|-
| 10 || align="left" | || 2640 || 0 || ½ || ½ || ½ || 0 || 0 || ½ || ½ || 0 ||  || ½ || ½ || 1 || ½ || 5 || || 29.50 || 2672
|-
| 11 || align="left" | || 2811 || ½ || ½ || 0 || 0 || 0 || ½ || 0 || ½ || ½ || ½ ||  || ½ || ½ || 1 || 5 || || 28.00 || 2659
|- 
| 12 || align="left" | || 2718 || 0 || 0 || 0 || ½ || 0 || ½ || ½ || ½ || ½ || ½ || ½ ||  || ½ || 1 || 5 || || 27.00 || 2666
|-
| 13 || align="left" | || 2655 || 0 || 0 || 0 || 0 || ½ || 0 || ½ || ½ || ½ || 0 || ½ || ½ ||  || ½ || 3½ || || || 2583
|-
| 14 || align="left" | || 2680 || 0 || 0 || ½ || 0 || 0 || 0 || ½ || 0 || ½ || ½ || 0 || 0 || ½ ||  || 2½ || || || 2505
|}
 Final blitz tie-break: Magnus Carlsen def. Anish Giri, 1½–½.

{| class="wikitable" style="text-align: center;"
|+2018 Tata Steel Challengers, 13–28 January 2018, Wijk aan Zee, Netherlands, Category XV (2612)
! !! Player !! Rating !! 1 !! 2 !! 3 !! 4 !! 5 !! 6 !! 7 !! 8 !! 9 !! 10 !! 11 !! 12 !! 13 !! 14 !! Total !! SB !!  !! TPR
|-
| 1 || align=left| || 2718 ||  || ½ || ½ || 1 || ½ || 1 || ½ || ½ || ½ || ½ || ½ || 1 || 1 || 1 || 9 || || || 2745
|-
| 2 || align="left" | || 2652 || ½ ||  || ½ || 0 || 1 || 0 || 1 || ½ || 1 || 1 || ½ || ½ || ½ || 1 || 8 || || || 2696
|-
| 3 || align="left" | || 2634 || ½ || ½ ||  || ½ || ½ || ½ || 1 || 1 || ½ || 0 || 1 || ½ || ½ || ½ || 7½ || 47.75 || || 2667
|-
| 4 || align="left" | || 2693 || 0 || 1 || ½ ||  || ½ || 1 || ½ || ½ || ½ || ½ || 0 || 1 || ½ || 1 || 7½ || 46.75 || || 2663
|-
| 5 || align="left" | || 2629 || ½ || 0 || ½ || ½ ||  || ½ || 0 || ½ || ½ || 1 || 1 || 1 || 1 || ½ || 7½ || 45.50 || || 2668
|-
| 6 || align="left" | || 2622 || 0 || 1 || ½ || 0 || ½ ||  || ½ || ½ || 1 || ½ || 1 || ½ || ½ || 1 || 7½ || 45.00 || || 2668
|-
| 7 || align="left" | || 2640 || ½ || 0 || 0 || ½ || 1 || ½ ||  || ½ || ½ || ½ || 1 || ½ || 1 || 0 || 6½ || || || 2610
|-
| 8 || align="left" | || 2634 || ½ || ½ || 0 || ½ || ½ || ½ || ½ ||  || ½ || ½ || ½ || ½ || ½ || ½ || 6 || 38.75 || || 2581
|-
| 9 || align="left" | || 2607 || ½ || 0 || ½ || ½ || ½ || 0 || ½ || ½ ||  || ½ || 1 || ½ || ½ || ½ || 6 || 37.50 || 7 || 2583
|-
| 10 || align="left" | || 2599 || ½ || 0 || 1 || ½ || 0 || ½ || ½ || ½ || ½ ||  || 0 || ½ || ½ || 1 || 6 || 37.50 || 6 || 2584
|-
| 11 || align="left" | || 2481 || ½ || ½ || 0 || 1 || 0 || 0 || 0 || ½ || 0 || 1 ||  || ½ || ½ || 1 || 5½ || 33.75 || || 2565
|- 
| 12 || align="left" | || 2671 || 0 || ½ || ½ || 0 || 0 || ½ || ½ || ½ || ½ || ½ || ½ ||  || ½ || 1 || 5½ || 32.50 || || 2550
|-
| 13 || align="left" | || 2497 || 0 || ½ || ½ || ½ || 0 || ½ || 0 || ½ || ½ || ½ || ½ || ½ ||  || ½ || 5 ||  || || 2534
|-
| 14 || align="left" | || 2489 || 0 || 0 || ½ || 0 || ½ || 0 || 1 || ½ || ½ || 0 || 0 || 0 || ½ ||  || 3½ ||  || || 2446
|}

2019

Magnus Carlsen was the winner of this tournament, with a score of 9/13.

2020s

2020

Fabiano Caruana was the winner of this tournament, with a score of 10/13.

2021

Jorden van Foreest was the winner of this tournament, with a score of 8½/13. He defeated Anish Giri in an Armageddon playoff.

2022
Magnus Carlsen was the winner of this tournament, with a score of 9½/13.

2023

Anish Giri won the 85th edition Tata Steel Chess 2023 finishing the tournament with 8½ out of 13 points. He defeated the world's top two ranked players (Magnus Carlsen and Ding Liren) in the process.

See also
 List of strong chess tournaments

References
Notes

Bibliography

External links

 
Tata Steel Europe
Chess competitions
Chess in the Netherlands
International sports competitions hosted by the Netherlands
1938 establishments in the Netherlands
Recurring sporting events established in 1938
Sports competitions in North Holland
Sport in Beverwijk